= Ellis v. United States =

Ellis v. United States may refer to:

- Ellis v. United States (1907), 206 U.S. 246
- Ellis v. United States (1958), 356 U.S. 674, decided by the Warren Court
- Ellis v. United States (1969), 16 F.2d 791
