= Albert Schneider =

American architect (1884–1924)

Albert Moreland Schneider
- Born: April 29, 1884; Washington, D.C., U.S.
- Died: January 14, 1924 (aged 39); Washington, D.C., U.S.
- Resting place: Rock Creek Cemetery; Washington, D.C., U.S.
- Occupation: Architect
- Buildings: Clifton Terrace

Albert Moreland Schneider (April 29, 1884 – January 14, 1924) was an architect in Washington DC during the early 20th century whose work included historic landmark hotels, row houses and residential homes.

Born April 29, 1884, in Washington, D.C., to William Edwin Schneider and Rachael Elizabeth Davis. His father was a well-known inventor in the DC area and the Schneider family was one of the most prominent families in Washington DC during the late 19th and early 20th centuries. The Schneiders emigrated from Lauffen am Neckar Baden-Württemberg Germany in 1832 aboard the ship Palemburg. Albert attended the prestigious Emerson Preparatory School as a youth and would become one of the notable up and coming young architects of the D.C. area when he began practicing.

== Early life ==
Albert was the second child of William Edwin Schneider and Rachael Elizabeth Davis. Albert's ancestors were from Lauffen am Neckar and emigrated to Baltimore in 1832 before a cholera outbreak forced them to move north into the Washington DC area. The Schneiders were tradesmen and were known as expert foundry men in their homeland and quickly set up an iron foundry in DC making tools for glass making businesses. Their foundry provided wrought iron steel roof structures for notable buildings in the Washington DC area. Their accomplishments are depicted in a book in the Library of Congress. Albert's uncle was Thomas Franklin Schneider, a developer, builder and architect in Washington DC who had a great influence on Albert during his youth. Albert lived in The Cairo apartment building which his uncle designed and developed and also lived in. It was during this time that Albert attended the prestigious Emerson Preparatory School.

== Architecture ==
In a 1907 article in The Washington Post, Albert is mentioned as one of the 25 influential architects in the Nations Capital. Albert designed several single family houses as well as apartment buildings throughout the DC area from 1905 through 1923. Three buildings he designed during this time are on the National Register of Historic Places:

- Clifton Terrace
- The Calumet
- The Brittany

His style leaned more toward Colonial Revival and is seen in Clifton Terrace. During this time, Albert worked with Harry Wardman on several of these buildings. He also designed several homes in the area similar to the one designed for Mrs. H.M. Halliday on 1629 K Street, N.W., Washington DC. Albert's work is also published in several books such as American Architect and Architectural Volume 89 and in Capital Drawings: Architectural Designs for Washington D.C. His work in Washington D.C. is also documented in the Intensive-Level Survey of Lanier Heights published in 2008. The National Register of Historical Places - Registration form for Clifton Terrace gives some additional information of the architectural style and collaboration between Albert and Frank Russell White and the development influences of Harry Wardman. It also states in that same document other buildings Albert was responsible for erecting. These works are as follows:

- 1905 3 Street, NE building for JT and JF Ferry
- A dwelling on Kalorama Road in 1908
- A three-story 1909 apartment building on U Street
- Four-story apartment on T Street in 1915
- Four-story apartment building on 17th Street
- Four-story apartment on California Street, NW
- Three-story apartment on T Street
- Apartment/dwelling on 16 Street
- Seven-story apartment on both K and M Streets
- Two dwellings on Connecticut Avenue.

In the bibliography section of this document lists the following:

- "Albert M. Schneider Claimed by Death" Washington Star. January 15, 1924.
- "A.M. Schneider Rites to Be Conducted Today" Washington Star, January 16, 1924.

Albert Moreland Schneider died aged 39 of unknown causes. He is buried with his parents in Rock Creek Cemetery in Washington D.C.
