= 31st Scripps National Spelling Bee =

Spelling bee held in the United States in 1958

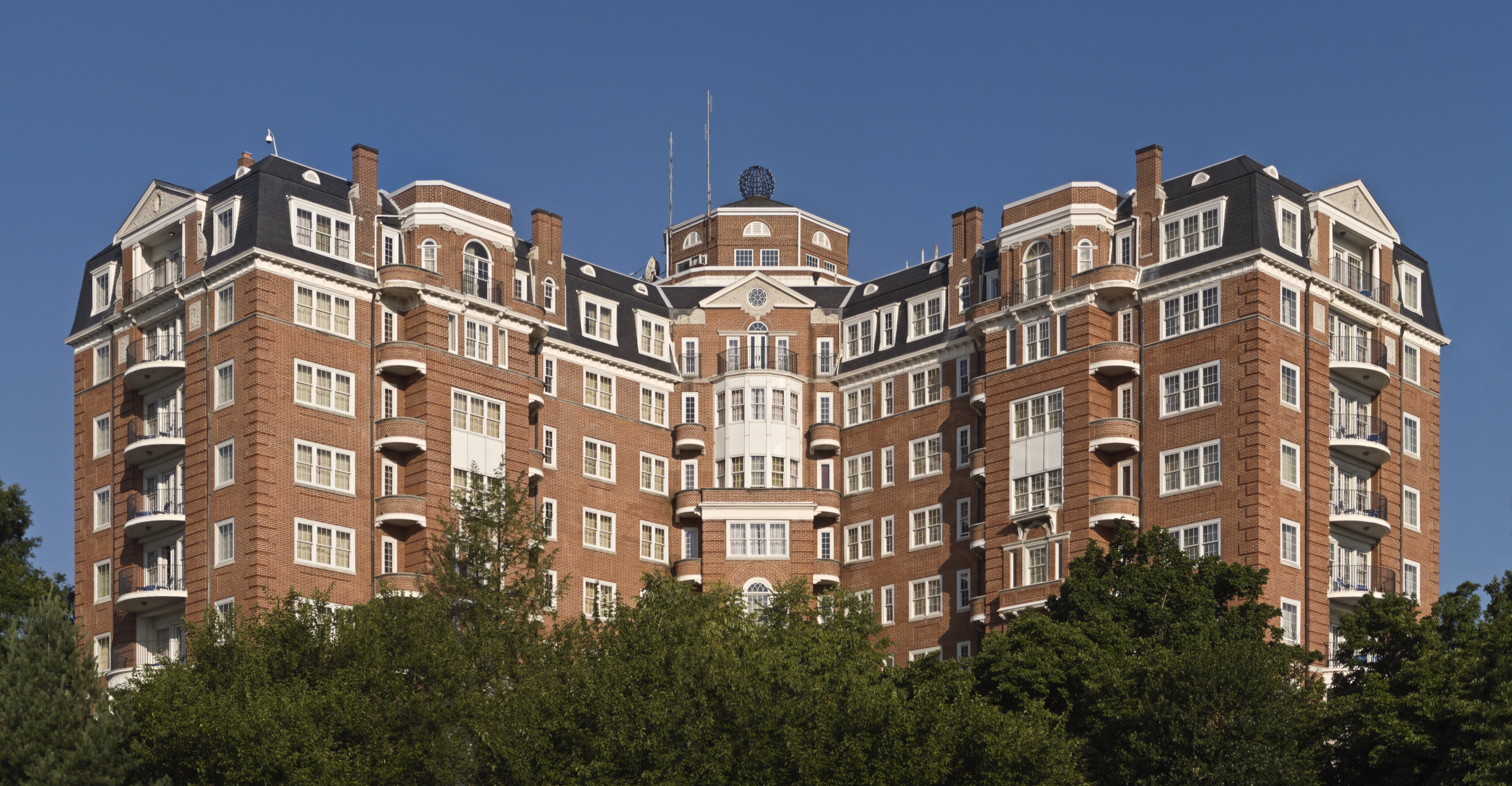
- Sheraton Park Hotel, site of the 31st Scripps National Spelling Bee
- Date: June 11–12, 1958
- Location: Sheraton Park Hotel ballroom, Washington, D.C.
- Winner: Jolitta Schlehuber (14 at time of win)
- Sponsor: Topeka Daily Capital
- Sponsor location: Topeka, Kansas
- Winning word: syllepsis
- No. of contestants: 68
- Pronouncer: Benson S. Alleman

The 31st Scripps National Spelling Bee was held in Washington, District of Columbia on June 11–12, 1958, by the E.W. Scripps Company.

The winner was 14-year-old eighth-grader Jolitta Schlehuber of McPherson, Kansas, sponsored by the Topeka Daily Capital. She correctly spelled the word syllepsis. She placed fourth the prior year, and was the first winner from Kansas. Second place went to Terry Madeira of Elizabethtown, Pennsylvania, who misspelled propylaeum. A talent scout for The $64,000 Question game show in the audience invited Schlehuber to appear on that show, where she won $8,000, which she used to pay college tuition.

After the 1957 Bee took almost 10 hours, this was the first time the Bee was put on a two-day program. There were 68 contestants, 27 boys and 41 girls. Forty-eight spellers were eliminated in eleven rounds on the first day of competition on Wednesday, June 11, leaving 12 girls and 8 boys for the second and final day of competition. Benson S. Alleman was pronouncer.

The top prize was $1,000, with $500 for second, $250 for third, $100 for the next five, $50 for the next ten, and $25 each for the rest.
