= 30th Scripps National Spelling Bee =

National Spelling Bee held in the District of Columbia in June 1957

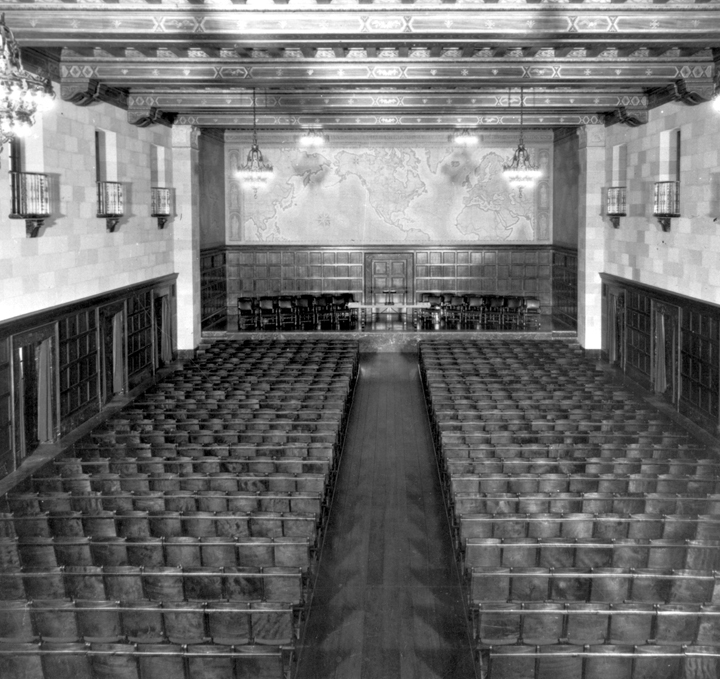
- Department of Commerce auditorium
- Date: June 7, 1957
- Location: Department of Commerce auditorium, Washington, D.C.
- Winner: Dana Bennett / Sandra Owen (tie) (13 / 14 at time of win)
- Winning word: schappe (last word, both failed to spell)
- No. of contestants: 67
- Pronouncer: Benson S. Alleman

The 30th Scripps National Spelling Bee was held in Washington, District of Columbia, on June 7, 1957, by the E.W. Scripps Company.

67 contestants participated. The winners were Dana Bennett (age 13 of Denver) and Sandra Owen (age 14 of Navarre, Ohio), declared co-champions after the word list was exhausted. The final word was schappe, which both failed to correctly spell. The competition lasts 37 rounds, the last 14 with only the final two contestants. At one point Owen was overcome with tears, and Bennett became nauseated, leading to a 10-minute recess. Each winner received a $1000 prize and trip to New York. Owen had been the runner-up in the prior year's competition. This was the second-ever tie in the competition, the first occurring at the 1950 bee. The winners got to meet Vice President Richard Nixon on June 9.

Third place went to Mary Gilliland, 13, of Fort Worth, Texas ($250 prize), who failed to properly spell eudaemonic in the 23rd round. Jolitta Schlehuber placed fourth, but returned to win the next year.

The competition lasted from 9 am until 6:55 pm, and was the longest in the competition's history. The competition moved to a two-day format for the first time the following year.
