= Clifton Terrace =

Historic structures in Washington, D.C., U.S.

- U.S. National Register of Historic Places
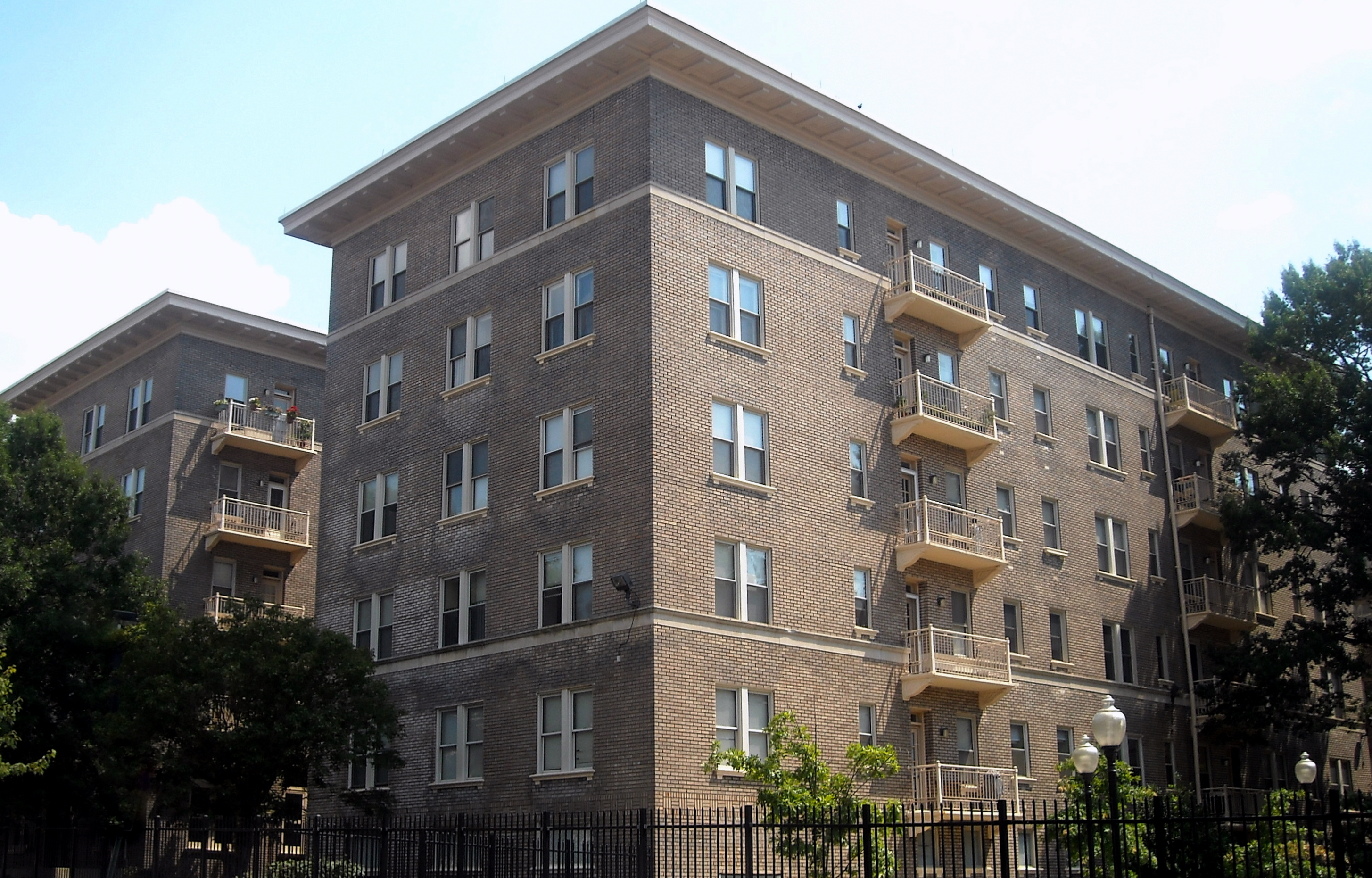

- Location within Washington, D.C.
- Location: 1308, 1312, 1350 Clifton St. NW; Washington, D.C.
- Coordinates: 38°55′19″N 77°1′52″W
- Built: 1914–1915
- Architect: Frank Russell White; A.M. Schneider
- Architectural style: Colonial Revival
- NRHP reference No.: 01001366
- Added to NRHP: December 26, 2001

Clifton Terrace are historic structures located in the Columbia Heights neighborhood in the Northwest quadrant of Washington, D.C. Frank Russell White and Albert Moreland Schneider designed the three building apartment complex in the Colonial Revival style. They were inspired by the garden city movement. Harry Wardman built the complex from 1914–1915 along the 14th Street streetcar line. It was listed on the National Register of Historic Places in 2001.

The buildings are also known for forming the backdrop of Javins v. First National Realty Corp., 428 F.2d 1071 (D.C. Cir. 1970), a landmark case establishing the warranty of habitability in landlord-tenant law.
