= Javins v. First National Realty Corp. =

- Court: United States Court of Appeals for the District of Columbia Circuit
- Full case name: Ethel Javins v. First National Realty Corporation
- Argued: January 16 1970
- Decided: May 7 1970
- Citation: 428 F.2d 1071

Holding
- A warranty of habitability, measured by the standards set out in the DC Housing Regulations, was implied by law into leases of urban dwelling units, and breach of the warranty gave rise to a breach of contract claim.

Court membership
- Judges sitting: Circuit Judges James Skelly Wright, Carl E. McGowan, Roger Robb

Case opinions
- Majority: James Skelly Wright

Javins v. First National Realty Corp., 428 F.2d 1071 (D.C. Cir. 1970), was a case decided by the D.C. Circuit that first established the warranty of habitability in landlord–tenant law. The court determined that if the premises become uninhabitable, the tenant is freed from their obligation to pay rent.

Tenants of Washington, D.C.'s Clifton Terrace Apartments, including Ethel Javins, Rudolph Saunders and Stanley Gross, had refused to pay their rent due to the conditions in the building complex. First National Realty sued those three, as well as other rent strikers, for possession. The first trial took place on June 17, 1966. The tenants attempted to introduce evidence that the dwellings were uninhabitable, including bags of mouse feces, dead mice, roaches and the testimony of a housing inspector that there were more than 1000 code violations. However, Judge Austin L. Fickling disallowed the evidence, and ruled in favor of First National Realty.

Javins, Saunders, Gross and a fourth tenant, Gladys Grant, appealed the decision to the District of Columbia Court of Appeals. Edmund E. Fleming, the tenants' lawyer, argued that the court should find an implied warranty of habitability in the lease, based on the idea of constructive eviction. Despite the fact that briefs were submitted relatively quickly, the oral argument for the Court of Appeals case did not occur until 2 years after the initial trial. During that time, Sidney Brown, the owner of First National Realty, was put in jail for heating system code violations. The Court of Appeals affirmed the lower court's decision, and the tenants appealed to the D.C. Circuit.

Judge J. Skelly Wright's opinion sets up a contrast between the "old doctrines" of landlord-tenant law, which were based on feudal property law, and the modern approach to leases, which could be considered contractual relations between landlords and tenants. Wright says that leases of "urban dwelling units" should be "interpreted and construed like any other contract." Therefore, as contracts for sales of goods have warranties of quality under the common law, leases create implied warranties of quality in housing. Tenants who are being sued for nonpayment of rent have the right to introduce evidence of housing code violations - if the landlord is not providing a habitable environment, the contract is breached and tenant does not have to pay rent.
