= Grafton v. United States =

- Supreme Court of the United States

Decided May 27, 1907
- Full case name: Grafton v. United States
- Citations: 206 U.S. 333 (more)

Holding
- The Double Jeopardy Clause is not violated when the first conviction came from a court without jurisdiction to try the offense. Also, the separate sovereigns exception to the Double Jeopardy Clause does not apply in a U.S. territory because an insular area is not a sovereign state.

Court membership
- Chief Justice Melville Fuller Associate Justices John M. Harlan · David J. Brewer; Edward D. White · Rufus W. Peckham; Joseph McKenna · Oliver W. Holmes Jr. William R. Day · William H. Moody

Grafton v. United States, 206 U.S. 333 (1907), was a United States Supreme Court case in which the court held that the Double Jeopardy Clause is not violated when the first conviction came from a court without jurisdiction to try the offense. Also, the separate sovereigns exception to the Double Jeopardy Clause does not apply in a U.S. territory because an insular area is not a sovereign state.

== Background ==
After a soldier stationed in the Philippine Islands territory was court-martialed on a charge of manslaughter, he was acquitted. After that, he was indicted by the provincial court in Iloilo on murder charges. The soldier plead autrefois acquit to assert double jeopardy as a defense. The court rejected his plea. On appeal, that rejection was reversed and the defendant was released.

== Opinion of the court ==
The Supreme Court issued an opinion on May 27, 1907.
