= J. Skelly Wright =

American judge (1911-1988)

Skelly Wright
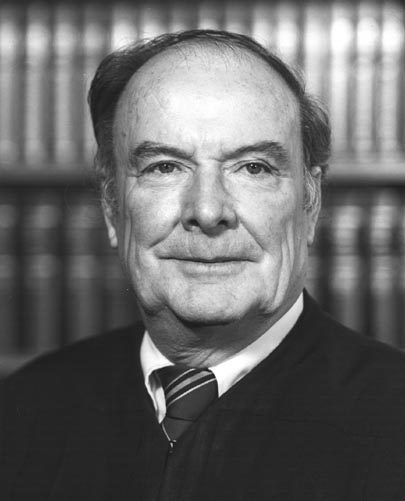

Senior Judge of United States Court of Appeals for the District of Columbia Circuit
- In office June 1, 1986 – August 6, 1988

Chief Judge of the United States Court of Appeals for the District of Columbia Circuit
- In office March 27, 1978 – January 14, 1981
- Preceded by: David L. Bazelon
- Succeeded by: Carl E. McGowan

Judge of the United States Court of Appeals for the District of Columbia Circuit
- In office March 30, 1962 – June 1, 1986
- Appointed by: John F. Kennedy
- Preceded by: E. Barrett Prettyman
- Succeeded by: Douglas H. Ginsburg

Judge of the United States District Court for the Eastern District of Louisiana
- In office October 21, 1949 – March 30, 1962
- Appointed by: Harry S. Truman
- Preceded by: Wayne G. Borah
- Succeeded by: Frank Burton Ellis

Personal details
- Born: James Skelly Wright; January 14, 1911 New Orleans, Louisiana, U.S.
- Died: August 6, 1988 (aged 77) Bethesda, Maryland, U.S.
- Education: Loyola University New Orleans (PhB, JD)

James Skelly Wright (January 14, 1911 – August 6, 1988) was a United States circuit judge of the United States Court of Appeals for the District of Columbia Circuit and previously was a United States district judge of the United States District Court for the Eastern District of Louisiana.

== Early life and career ==
Born on January 14, 1911, in New Orleans, Louisiana, Wright received a Bachelor of Philosophy in 1931 from Loyola University New Orleans and a Juris Doctor in 1934 from Loyola University New Orleans College of Law. He was a high school teacher in New Orleans from 1932 to 1936. He was a lecturer at Loyola University New Orleans from 1936 to 1937. He was an Assistant United States Attorney for the Eastern District of Louisiana from 1937 to 1942 and again from 1945 to 1946. He was a United States Coast Guard lieutenant commander from 1942 to 1945. He was in private practice in Washington, D.C., from 1946 to 1948. Wright was the United States Attorney for the Eastern District of Louisiana from 1948 to 1949. He was faculty at the Loyola University of New Orleans College of Law from 1950 to 1962.

== Eastern District of Louisiana ==
Wright received a recess appointment from President Harry S. Truman on October 21, 1949, to a seat on the United States District Court for the Eastern District of Louisiana vacated by Judge Wayne G. Borah. He was nominated to the same position by President Truman on January 5, 1950. He was confirmed by the United States Senate on March 8, 1950, and received his commission on March 9, 1950. His service terminated on April 15, 1962, due to elevation to the District of Columbia Circuit.

During his service with the Eastern District of Louisiana, Wright was an important leader during the New Orleans school desegregation crisis. Wright's first desegregation order had been for the Louisiana State University Law School in 1951. His vigorous enforcement of Brown v. Board of Education (1954), however, made him many enemies amongst the predominantly white political and business culture of New Orleans to the extent that his entire family was soon ostracized and isolated from much of New Orleans' society life.

== D.C. Circuit Court ==
Wright was nominated by President John F. Kennedy on February 2, 1962, to a seat on the United States Court of Appeals for the District of Columbia Circuit vacated by Judge E. Barrett Prettyman. He was confirmed by the Senate on March 28, 1962, and received his commission on March 30, 1962. He served as Chief Judge from March 27, 1978 to January 14, 1981. He assumed senior status on June 1, 1986. He served as a Judge of the Temporary Emergency Court of Appeals from 1981 to 1987, serving as Chief Judge from 1982 to 1987.

=== Notable cases ===
- In Williams v. Walker-Thomas Furniture Co. (1965), Wright interpreted the common law concept of contract unconscionability to prevent the exploitation of the poor. This is a major decision in the field of consumer protection.
- In Hobson v. Hansen (1967), Wright held that tracking in schools compromised the "right to equal educational opportunity" for the District's poor and disadvantaged.
- In Javins v. First National Realty Corp. (1970), Wright developed the theory of implied warranty of habitability in the field of lease law.
- In Edwards v. Habib (1969) and Robinson v. Diamond Housing Corp. (1972), Wright developed the retaliatory eviction doctrine, prohibiting landlords from evicting tenants who raised housing code violations to authorities.
- In New York Times Co. v. United States, Wright argued in dissent that the Nixon administration could not block the publication of the Pentagon Papers. The Supreme Court agreed with Wright, and overruled the D.C circuit.

== Death and legacy ==
Wright died on August 6, 1988, in the Westmoreland Hills neighborhood of Bethesda, Maryland. Justice William J. Brennan Jr. wrote a memoriam for Judge Wright in the Harvard Law Review.

Wright is recognized for exerting a major influence on the American law of landlord-tenant. Several of his decisions on the D.C. Circuit helped modernize landlord-tenant jurisprudence by incorporating consumer protection principles long accepted in contract law.

The J. Skelly Wright Professorship at Yale Law School is named in his honor.

=== Notable former clerks ===
- Richard "Rick" Cotton, current Executive Director of the Port Authority of New York and New Jersey, former EVP and General Counsel of NBC Universal
- Keith P. Ellison, Judge for the United States District Court for the Southern District of Texas
- Susan Estrich, attorney and Fox News personality
- Richard H. Fallon Jr., Harvard Law School professor
- Raymond C. Fisher, Judge for the U.S. Court of Appeals for the Ninth Circuit
- Thomas C. Grey, Stanford Law School professor
- Michael C. Harper, Boston University School of Law professor
- John Herfort, partner at Gibson, Dunn & Crutcher LLP
- Curtis A. Hessler, former Assistant Secretary of the Treasury for Economic Policy
- Peter J. Kalis, K&L Gates Chairman and Global Managing Partner,
- Sally Katzen, Former official in the Clinton White House
- Randall Kennedy, Harvard Law School professor and author
- Michael W. McConnell, former Judge for United States Court of Appeals for the Tenth Circuit
- Victoria Radd Rollins, aide to the Bill Clinton administration
- Abraham David Sofaer, former Judge of the United States District Court for the Southern District of New York and later Legal Adviser of the Department of State
- Louis Michael Seidman, Georgetown University Law Center professor
- Carol S. Steiker, Harvard Law School professor
- David O. Stewart, author and attorney
- Geoffrey R. Stone, University of Chicago Law School professor
- Donald B. Verrilli Jr., Solicitor General of the United States
- John F. Walsh, United States Attorney for the District of Colorado
- Robert Weisberg, Stanford Law School professor

=== Notable opinions ===
Opinions are written for the D.C. Circuit unless otherwise noted.

- Majority opinions: Williams v. Walker-Thomas Furniture Co. (1965), Hobson v. Hansen (D.D.C. 1967), Edwards v. Habib (1968), Javins v. First National Realty Corp. (1970), Calvert Cliffs' Coordinating Committee, Inc. v. Atomic Energy Commission (1971), Halperin v. Kissinger (1979), Bundy v. Jackson (1981)
- Majority opinions upheld by the Supreme Court: Students Challenging Regulatory Agency Procedures v. United States (D.D.C. 1972)
- Majority opinions overturned by the Supreme Court: Chaney v. Heckler (1983)
- Dissents: Ellis v. United States (1969), United States v. Moore (1973)

== See also ==
- List of United States federal judges by longevity of service

Legal offices
| Preceded by Wayne G. Borah | Judge of the United States District Court for the Eastern District of Louisiana; 1950–1962 | Succeeded by Frank Burton Ellis |
| Preceded by E. Barrett Prettyman | Judge of the United States Court of Appeals for the District of Columbia Circuit; 1962–1986 | Succeeded by Douglas H. Ginsburg |
| Preceded by David L. Bazelon | Chief Judge of the United States Court of Appeals for the District of Columbia Circuit; 1978–1981 | Succeeded by Carl E. McGowan |
| Preceded by Edward Allen Tamm | Chief Judge of the Temporary Emergency Court of Appeals; 1982–1987 | Succeeded by Reynaldo Guerra Garza |
