= Kessler v. Eldred =

- Supreme Court of the United States

Submitted April 17, 1907 Decided May 13, 1907
- Full case name: Kessler v. Eldred
- Citations: 206 U.S. 285 (more) 27 S. Ct. 611; 51 L. Ed. 1065; 1907 U.S. LEXIS 1164

Court membership
- Chief Justice Melville Fuller Associate Justices John M. Harlan · David J. Brewer; Edward D. White · Rufus W. Peckham; Joseph McKenna · Oliver W. Holmes Jr. William R. Day · William H. Moody

Case opinion
- Majority: Moody, joined by unanimous

Kessler v. Eldred, 206 U.S. 285 (1907), was a United States Supreme Court case in which the Court defined some effects of a court decision that an inventor had not infringed on a patent.

== Background ==
Eldred had acquired a patent for an electric lamp lighter. Kessler's business manufactured electric cigar lighters. Eldred sued Kessler's company for patent infringement, but Indiana courts found no infringement. Later Eldred sued a distributor of Kessler's devices for infringement, and Kessler lost business as a result. Kessler took over the defense against this lawsuit too, and countersued. The case came from the seventh Circuit Court to the Supreme Court.

Justice Moody issued the opinion, finding among other things that Eldred's second lawsuit was a "wrongful interference" in Kessler's business.

One analyst says "The seldom-used Kessler Doctrine (Kessler v. Eldred, 206 U.S. 285 (1907)) bars patent infringement litigation against systems found not to infringe in a prior action but sold subsequent to that action, even though claim and issue preclusion do not."
