= Frank Russell White =

American architect

- Born: May 2, 1889; Brooklyn, New York
- Died: October 24, 1961 (aged 72); Washington, D.C.
- Occupation: Architect
- Spouse(s): Eula Griffin (divorced); Carolyn W. White
- Children: Dorothy W. Neilson; Frank Russell White Jr.
- Buildings: Clifton Terrace; Wardman Park Hotel

Frank Russell White (May 2, 1889 – October 24, 1961) was an American architect who designed hotels, apartment buildings, commercial properties, and thousands of homes in Washington, D.C. A native of Brooklyn, White's family moved to the nation's capital during his childhood. Although he had no formal training, White was tutored by local architect Albert H. Beers and designed thousands of buildings for developer Harry Wardman.

White designed buildings in various styles, including Art Deco, Classical Revival, Colonial Revival, and Mediterranean Revival. One of his most well-known works is the Wardman Park Hotel, which was demolished in the 1970s and replaced with a modern building. One of his apartment designs, Clifton Terrace, is listed on the National Register of Historic Places.

White's personal life was often tumultuous, including his first marriage to an aspiring actress. During the Great Depression he experienced financial difficulties and was arrested on counterfeit charges along with his future second wife. After serving a two-year prison sentence, White continued to design buildings until his death in 1961.

== Biography ==
=== Career ===
Frank Russell White was born on May 2, 1889, in Brooklyn, New York. He attended public schools in New York until his family moved to Washington, D.C., when he was ten years old. White attended the Valley Forge Military Academy and College from 1903 to 1904 and began apprenticing for architect Albert H. Beers in 1908. As real estate developer Harry Wardman's chief architect from 1905 to 1911, Beers designed around 1,000 houses and 70 apartment buildings. Several of these apartment building designs were completed by White after Beers' death in 1911, including the Northumberland Apartments at 2039 New Hampshire Avenue NW, The Dresden at 2126 Connecticut Avenue NW, and The Avondale at 1734 P Street NW.

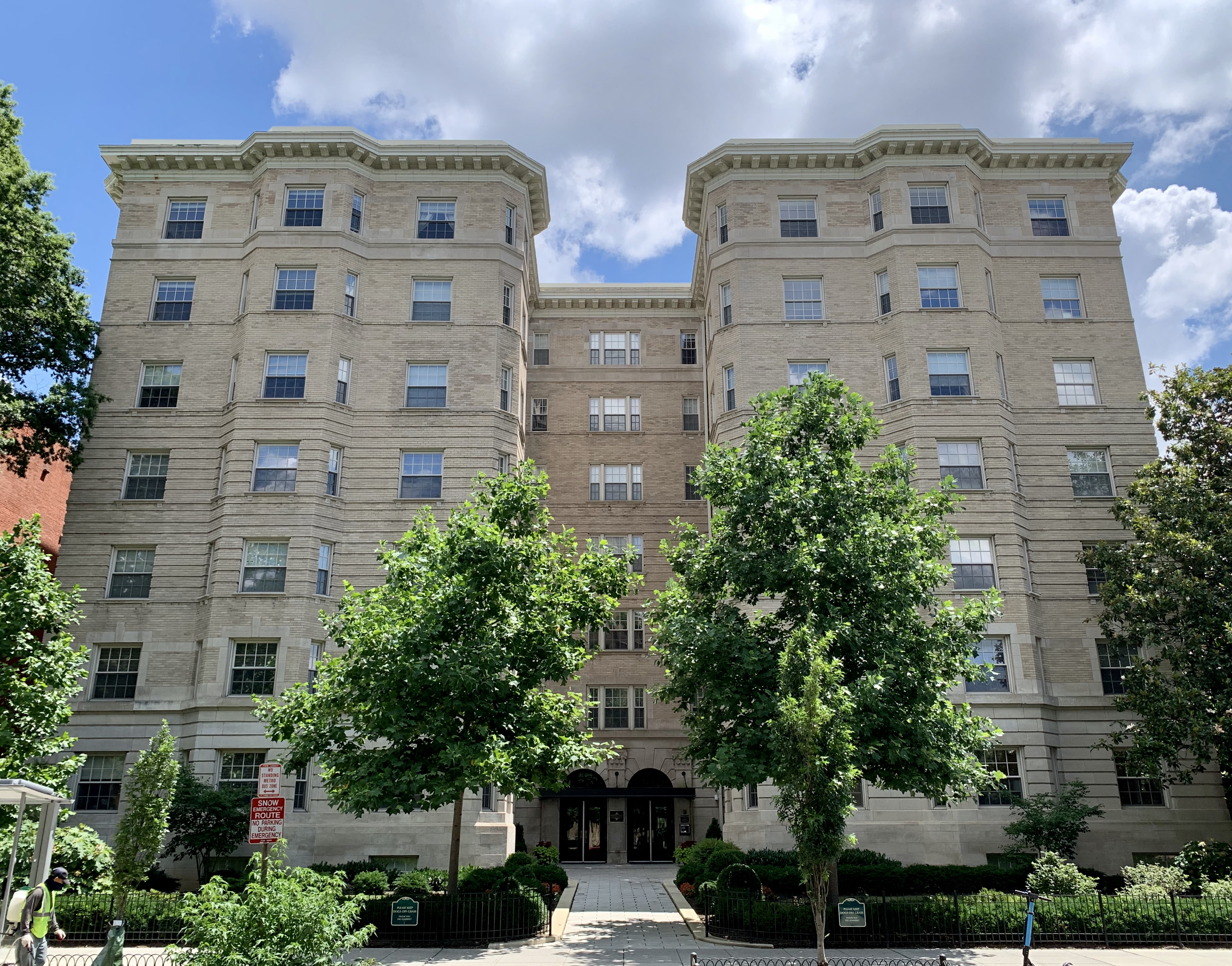
White designed the Somerset House in 1916 for Harry Wardman.

White continued working for Wardman, becoming one of his master architects at a time Wardman was building thousands of homes and apartment buildings in Washington, D.C. The combination of Beers' tutoring and working with prolific developer Wardman resulted in White becoming a skilled architect, designing a variety of building types. White's professional relationship with Wardman continued for 25 years, although he began working with other developers in 1917 including Victor Cahill, Anita Eckles, Zachariah T. Goldsmith, Fred Gore, Joseph A. Howar, Karla King, and Ernest G. Walker.

The buildings White designed demonstrate a variety of architectural styles. Examples of this include three Clifton Terrace buildings in the Colonial Revival style, The Lealand on 16th Street NW in the Mediterranean Revival style, the Northbrook Courts on 16th Street in the Classical Revival style, and the Heurich Building (demolished) on K Street in the Art Deco style. In addition to designing, White also developed buildings later in his career, including the Schuyler Arms on Columbia Road NW and Parkway Apartments on Connecticut Avenue NW.

During his career White designed over 5,000 houses, 51 apartment buildings, hotels, commercial properties, and even an affordable bomb shelter meant to hold 30 people. In addition to Clifton Terrace, which is listed on the National Register of Historic Places, White's most well known work is the original 1200-room Wardman Park Hotel, built in 1917 and modeled after The Homestead resort in Virginia. The hotel was torn down in the late 1970s and replaced with a modern facility.

=== Personal life ===
==== First marriage ====
When he was 18, White married Eula Griffin, an aspiring actress. The couple had one child, Dorothy, but their tumultuous relationship and bitter divorce were the subjects of local newspaper reports. Griffin filed for divorce in 1923, two years after the couple first separated, and told the court White had left their home at The Ambassador and was living in an apartment on G Street NW where "misconduct with several women" took place. A few months later White told the court his wife had been staying out all night the month he left and claimed she had been dating a Navy lieutenant for the past year, the same man she was arrested with for disorderly conduct while at the Wardman Park Hotel pool in 1922. During one visit to his wife, White said he found her "very lightly clad, the bedroom poorly lighted and a man sitting in the bedroom." They continued accusing each other of improper behavior and the divorce was later finalized.

==== Arrest ====
During the Great Depression White experienced severe financial difficulties. He was known to be bad at dealing with finances, including giving loans to unethical friends and being involved in projects that were not financially sound. One of these projects included White taking out a $340,000 loan (over $5 million in 2020 dollars) to build the Parkway Apartments. When the project did not live up to expectations, White had to move to Bowie, Maryland, to live with his mother, where the two were unable to afford coal to heat the house.

During this time White had very few projects and in 1930 he resorted to crudely making 21 counterfeit $100 bills by changing the numbers in the corners of $1 bills. A year later his girlfriend Carolyn Wildman of Washington, D.C. attempted to make a purchase at a Baltimore jewelry store with one of the counterfeit bills and was arrested. On October 26, White turned himself into the Secret Service, and the couple plead guilty. White served two years in prison and Wildman served one year and a day.

==== Later years ====
After having served their sentences, White and Wildman married and had a son, Frank Russell White Jr. White continued his architectural practice a few years later, working on mostly smaller projects, and Carolyn, a former teacher who had attended the University of Maryland and Hood College, worked for the Department of Agriculture and was an active member of the National Society of the Daughters of the American Revolution. The couple lived at 4645 Alton Place NW.

White died of a blood disorder on October 24, 1961, at George Washington University Hospital. White was still designing buildings when he died, including a hotel and motel. Carolyn retired in 1964 and died at Sibley Memorial Hospital in 1977.

== Selected works ==
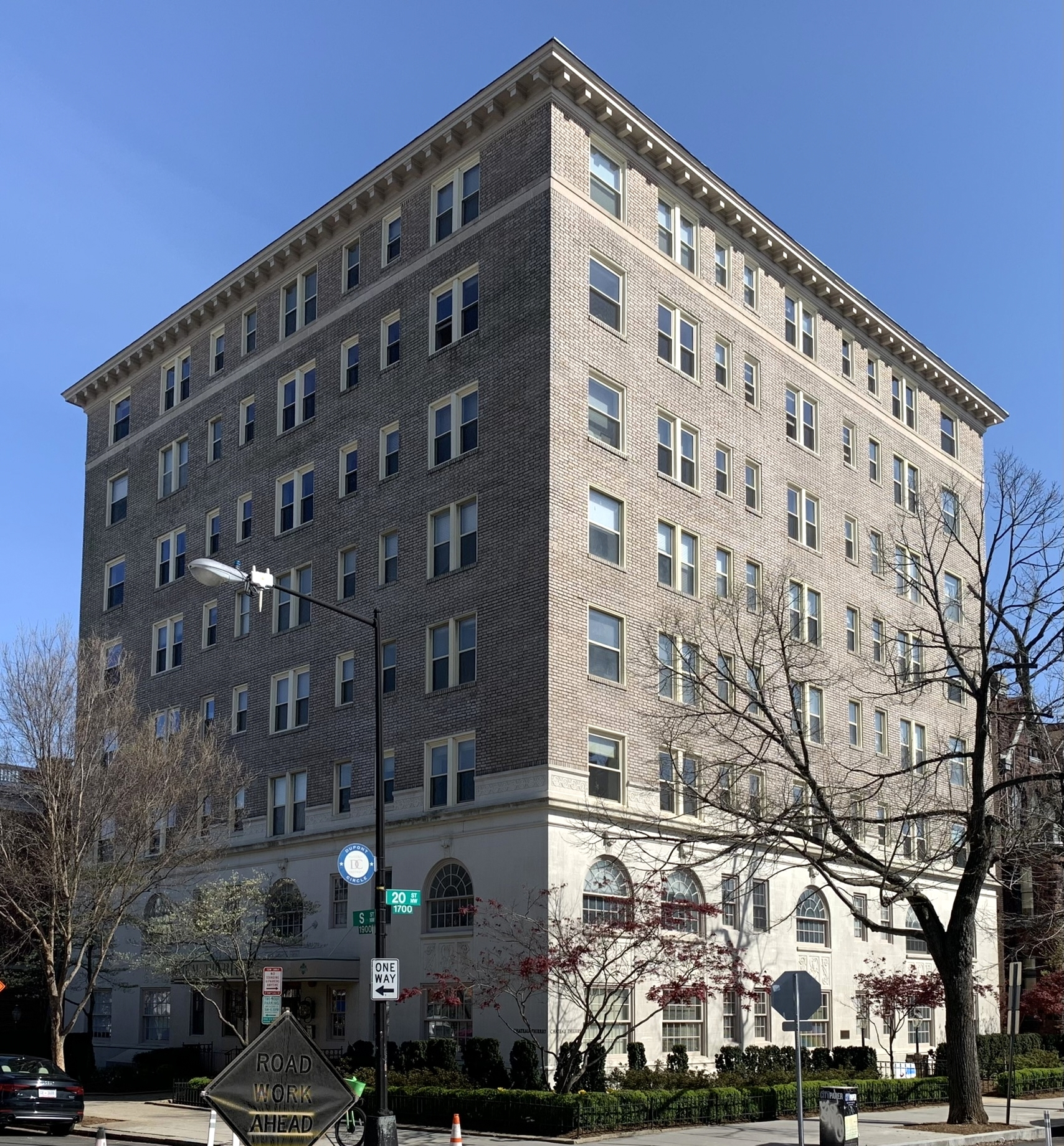
Chateau Thierry

- The Howard (1842 16th Street NW, 1913)
- The Avondale (1734 P Street NW, 1913)
- Clifton Terrace (1312-1350 Clifton Street NW; 1914)
- The Lealand (1830 16th Street NW, 1914)
- Willard Courts (1916 17th Street NW, 1915)
- The Farnsboro (2129 Florida Avenue NW, 1915)
- Somerset House (1801 16th Street NW, 1916)
- Rutland Courts (1725 17th Street NW, 1916)
- Copley Courts (1514 17th Street NW, 1916)
- 1915 I Street NW (1917; 1982 addition by Kerns Group Architects)
- Northbrook Courts (3420-26 16th Street NW, 1917)
- Wardman Park Hotel (2660 Woodley Road NW, 1917; demolished)
- Arthur D. Stanley House (2320 Massachusetts Avenue NW, 1918; Embassy of South Korea Consular Section)
- Chateau Thierry (1920 S Street NW, 1919)
- The Rochelle (2800 Connecticut Avenue NW, 1919)
- The Saint Mihiel (1720 16th Street NW, 1920)
- The Ambassador (1750 16th Street NW, 1920)
- The Montello (1901 Columbia Road NW, 1921)
- The Shelburne (1631 S Street NW, 1922)
- The Tiffany (1925 16th Street NW, 1922)
- Hampton Courts (2013 New Hampshire Avenue NW, 1925)
- Maryland Courts (518 9th Street and 816 E Street NE, 1926)
- Schuyler Arms (1954 Columbia Road NW, 1926)
- Parkway Apartments (3220 Connecticut Avenue NW; 1927)
- Heurich Building (1627 K Street NW, 1938; demolished)
- York Apartments (532 20th Street NW, 1940)
