= Hobson v. Hansen =

Federal case concerning segregation in education

- Court: District of Columbia Federal Court
- Decided: June 19, 1967

Hobson v. Hansen, 269 F. Supp. 401 (D.D.C. 1967), was a federal court case filed by civil rights activist Julius W. Hobson against Superintendent Carl F. Hansen and the District of Columbia's Board of Education on the charge that the current educational system deprived Black people and the poor of their right to equal educational opportunities relative to their white and affluent counterparts, on account of race and socioeconomic status. Having established de jure segregation unconstitutional in Bolling v. Sharpe (1954), the federal court addressed questions of de facto segregation in D.C. schools, seen in the trends that survived legal desegregation, in Hobson v. Hansen. Judge J. Skelly Wright's decision, in favor of the plaintiffs, sought to remedy the re-segregation or de facto segregation enforced by the educational policies, including tracking and optional-transfer zones, adopted by the Board of Education in an attempt to accommodate the consequences of the shift to integrated schools in the aftermath of Bolling, and within the wider context of emerging racially and socioeconomically rigid residential patterns.

It was the first federal court case to rule against discriminatory use of standardized tests in the context of educational tracking.

== Historical Context ==
The post-World War II era experienced a surge in white migration to the suburbs, "as city dwellers lured by the prospect of spacious new homes and easy financing left urban areas nationwide." The growth of the suburbs brought about the movement of employers, as well as the federal government, which began to "decentralize its operations by moving agencies to the suburbs." The civil rights advances of the late 1940s and early 1950s – including the Supreme Court's rulings in Hurd v. Hodge (1948) and Bolling v. Sharpe (1954) calling for desegregation in housing and education, respectively – catalyzed the flight to the suburbs. With blacks now having legal access to white neighborhoods, whites fled racially changing neighborhoods for fear of "declining real estate values, deteriorating schools, and a loss of status – having black neighbors, they felt, inherently made a neighborhood less desirable." White fears were further exacerbated as "schools that had been majority white soon became more than 80% black." Therefore, the decade between 1950 and 1960 witnessed a massive white migration to the suburbs; white population in the city declined from 65% to 45% as the population of blacks rose from 35% to 54%. In the 1960s, the former continued to drop as the latter rose. White flight made the preservation of integrated neighborhoods increasingly difficult; residential segregation grew more pronounced. Not only were Washington's white families fewer in number, they were also "heavily concentrated in one area of the city, the area west of Rock Creek Park… east of the park is very heavily Negro." This was reflected to a great degree in the racial composition of schools – ten years after the Bolling decision, "126 of the 185 public elementary schools in the District were 90-100 percent black, while thirteen elementary schools were 90-100 percent white." The legal end to de jure segregation was not sufficient to alter or counter the fact of racial segregation.

== Background ==
=== Julius Hobson ===
1965 was a volatile time in the District; African Americans were seeking betterment for their race as they were simultaneously facing pushback. Education stood as a symbol of advancement for many and Julius W. Hobson firmly agreed, having grown up in a home where "education was prized." Hobson's anger toward the public school system sprang much earlier when he was taking his son to kindergarten and had to drive "past white Woodridge Elementary down the street in order to attend overcrowded black Slowe Elementary a mile away." From this moment forward, he sought justice for his family and black families alike, beginning his attack against the school system in the District.

In a 1965 article pre-dating the lawsuit, Hobson was quoted saying, "I am against the track system and the whole concept of testing," and thus he launched his campaign against these ideals. Hobson began his attacks with non-violent protests. According to the article, he wanted to boycott the school and to have the superintendent removed from his position. He joined every pro-black group accessible to him, including the Parent Teacher Association, the Federation of Civic Associations, and the National Association for the Advancement of Colored People (NAACP). His work with these organizations drew national attention, resulting in his being hired to the Congress of Racial Equality (CORE), "a pacifist organization dedicated to using nonviolent direct action to challenge racial inequality," founded in 1942. The civil rights movement in the District during this time was a two-fold operation. African Americans were feeling a burgeoning unrest as they fought for their rights peacefully, while whites were reacting angrily with violence. Efforts such as "pickets, negotiations, and boycotts to pressure businesses to hire black employees at all job levels," by individuals like Hobson, prompted angry backlash from the white community. Alongside Sterling Tucker, Hobson worked through CORE, creating a "merit hiring" program for African Americans. Most of his efforts in these years represented nonviolent projects to secure better jobs, housing, and education for African Americans. In 1964 Hobson was cast out of CORE and his approach became more radical, culminating in his lawsuit against the school system.

=== Case Background ===
The Supreme Court in Bolling v. Sharpe (1954), a companion case to Brown v. Board of Education (1954), "held that the District of Columbia's racially segregated public school system violated the due process clause of the Fifth Amendment." The same year, the District's school officials adopted a neighborhood school policy "under which students were assigned to schools near their homes." With the court's decision in effect, "73% of the schools were – in varying degree – racially mixed," by September 1955. Educational integration meant that the achievement scores of black students were reported on a citywide basis in a manner uncharacteristic of the preceding system. In the aftermath of integration, Dr. Hansen, then Assistant Superintendent of senior high schools, began to receive "reports of very serious retardation in achievement in the basic skills [of black students]." The previously reigning "separate but equal" education system produced these consequences, only revealing themselves in the efforts to counter institutionalized educational segregation.

In an effort to "treat the causalities of de jure segregation," the Board of Education adopted optional-transfer zones and a track system. While the former gave residents "the option of transferring from nearby schools that were overcrowded and predominantly Negro to more distant schools that were integrated or predominantly white," the latter placed students at the elementary and secondary levels "in tracks or curriculum levels according to the school's assessment of each student's ability to learn." Dr. Hansen presented the track theory in his book Four Track Curriculum for Today's High Schools. He identified the two basic objectives underlying the system as "(1) The realization of the doctrine of equality of education and (2) The attainment of quality education." The system categorized students according to their abilities into several tracks in elementary and junior high schools: Honors (intellectually gifted), General (average and above-average), and Basic or Special Academic, with the addition of the Regular Track in senior high schools to accommodate the needs of above-average students – placement in either basic or general track in senior high school deprived students of the opportunity to take college preparatory classes. While the track system was flexible and accommodated cross-tracking in theory, its application was met with charges of discrimination against blacks and the poor.

=== Filing the Case ===
Having learned that his daughter Jean, a middle school student at the time, had been placed in the basic track, Julius Hobson filed a class action suit against Superintendent Carl Hansen in the U.S. District Court of the District of Columbia, heard by Judge J. Skelly Wright. (Wright, a circuit judge, was sitting by designation.) He claimed that the school system, "more than a decade after desegregation… was discriminating against black students by channeling them into lower rungs of rigid academic tracks that received inadequate resources and discouraged achievement." Therefore, the question at hand was "whether the defendants, the Superintendent of Schools and the members of the Board of Education, in the operation of the public school system here, unconstitutionally deprive the District's Negro and poor public school children of their right to equal educational opportunity with the District's white and more affluent public school children." Hobson was represented by William Kunstler and future corporation counsel of the District of Columbia Herbert O. Reid, Sr.

== Arguments ==
The plaintiffs mainly argued, with the support of testimonial and documentary evidence, that the track system, whether by intent or effect, "unconstitutionally discriminates against the Negro and the poor." The data presented revealed patterns of class-based and racial separation of students that clearly established relations between socioeconomic class and academic performance – the correlation between socioeconomic class and race was a strong and prominent one in the District. The data further revealed that "students attending the lower income predominantly Negro schools – a majority of District school children – typically are confined to the educational limits of the Special Academic or General Track." The separating effect was traced back to the means through which learning ability is measured; the District relied on the students' "performances in class and on standardized aptitude tests, both of which criteria are heavily – and, as it turns out, unfairly – weighted against the disadvantaged student," particularly since the latter is modeled for the middle-class white student, thus implementing "the self-fulfilling prophecy phenomenon." Other arguments targeted the quality and adequacy of facilities, allocation and provision of resources, per pupil expenditure, quality of teachers, faculty segregation, and overcrowding in predominantly black schools (while predominantly white schools ran under capacity).

The Harvard Law Review outlines the arguments used by Hobson, referencing related Supreme Court rulings that "scrutinized the underlying justification of statutes invading 'critical personal rights'." Hobson believed that these cases demonstrated "judicial willingness to intervene when important personal rights are at stake." He felt that in his case, the personal rights of minorities were being ignored through the track system. He saw the clear correlation between race and track placement, as well as between education and social advantage. He argued that education falls under "critical rights," claiming that it is "of signal importance to minority groups as a means of social advancement." Therefore, the court had to "weigh the benefits of neighborhood schools against the detriment to the educational opportunity of Negroes produced by segregation." The plaintiffs used a balance system in their argument, proving that the negatives outweigh the benefits of the track system, standardized testing, and neighborhood-based schooling.

The defendants argued that "assignments are governed by merit and need alone." Even so, they acknowledged the relation between enrollment in the tracks and socioeconomic status, while denying that "any racial bias is operating." Dr. Hansen argued and maintained that the origins of the four-track curriculum "clearly precede the event of desegregation." However, this does not deny that from its inception, it was meant as a response to the problems arising from integration, which highlighted the disparity in the equality of educational opportunity under the "separate but equal" educational regime that were supposed to be remedied as opposed to exacerbated by desegregation. According to the same review, Dr. Hansen and the Board's policies, "although nondiscriminatory in form and purpose, nevertheless fail to respond adequately to the educational needs of the Negroes and other disadvantaged minorities," without, or avoiding, giving rise to questions of intent.

== Decision ==
On June 19, 1967 the federal court ruled in favor of the plaintiffs, concluding that the current system of education compromises the District's disadvantaged – namely black people and the poor – of the "right to equal educational opportunity," based primarily on 11 findings of fact. The opinion articulates a critical sentiment, stating that "[i]n sum, all of the evidence in this case tends to show that the Washington school system is a monument to the cynicism of the power structure which governs the voteless capital of the greatest country on earth." The opinion then proceeds to outline the remedies to rectify the racial and economic discrimination evident in the operation of the District's public school system. The decree issued ordered the following:

"1. An injunction against racial and economic discrimination in the public school system here. 2. Abolition of the track system. 3. Abolition of the optional zones. 4. Transportation for volunteering children in overcrowded school districts east of Rock Creek Park to underpopulated schools west of the Park. 5. The defendants, by October 2, 1967, to file for approval by the court a plan for pupil assignment eliminating the racial and economic discrimination found to exist in the operation of the Washington public school system. 6. Substantial integration of the faculty of each school beginning with the school year 1967-8. 7. The defendants, by October 2, 1967, to file for approval by the court a teacher assignment plan fully integrating the faculty of each school."

Furthermore, the decree ordered the abolition of the track system, which is in principle "undemocratic and discriminatory," especially given its function of deciding which students will grow to occupy white-collar jobs, while preparing the rest for blue-collar jobs, as Dr. Hansen admitted. Judge Wright reasserted the democratic triumph the decision represented in emphasizing the extent of the insult of the track system, for "the danger of children completing their education wearing the wrong collar is far too great for this democracy to tolerate." The Court's ruling went beyond reasserting precedent decisions on the unconstitutionality of de jure segregation in declaring de facto segregation unconstitutional, largely through adopting a strict standard of judicial review that requires "overriding justification" from those adopting and implementing the policies for them to be permissible.

== Ramifications ==
=== Legal Consequences ===
In the aftermath of the Hobson victory, Superintendent Hansen sought to appeal the Court's decision. However, the Board of Education "voted 6 to 2 not to appeal and by a vote of 7 to 2 ordered Hansen not to appeal." Consequently, Dr. Hansen resigned and appealed, along with Board member Carl C. Smuck and 20 parents. Judge Wright allowed them to appeal before concluding that Hansen did not have standing, and that Hansen, Smuck, and the parents "had no legal grounds to intervene." The U.S. Court of Appeals upheld Judge Wright's 1967 decision, as the "orders abolishing optional zones and requiring faculty integration and voluntary busing to relieve overcrowding were affirmed. [While] [t]he order abolishing tracking was construed narrowly to refer to the track system "as it existed at the time of the decree," and implicitly not to prevent the school system from adopting a revised track system."

Meanwhile, Hobson "devoted himself to holding the school system accountable for implementing the decision," as he, with the aid of six supporters, launched the Washington Institute for Quality Education, a non-profit corporation aimed at "improving education in the District through further court action and "watchdog" activities." Questions over the extent to which the Hobson v. Hansen decree was accurately implemented and abided by led to further legal action, calling for the "equalization of all per-pupil expenditures from the regular school budget within a tolerance of plus or minus 5 percent of the mean for all elementary schools." In 1969, Hobson, who was by then an elected member of the Board, "returned to court to seek enforcement of the order rendered in Hobson I," launching yet another legal battle, Hobson II. Decided in 1971, the court sought to "set a standard for expenditures which will not interfere with the successful operation of the school system but which will ensure that it operates in a substantially nondiscriminatory fashion," in its decreed remedies, bringing an end to the Hobson legal episodes.

=== De Facto Legacies ===
Having been issued, the decree took effect. By that time, the school board had already launched a "construction program to correct inequalities in building facilities," thus responding to charges against the inequality and inadequacy of facilities. Most notably, the tracking system, and optional-transfer zones were now abolished, as Hobson set out to achieve. To accommodate the terms of the decree, corresponding "changes in school boundaries were made to place school enrollments nearer to capacity." Where these proved insufficient, children who volunteered could be bused from east of the Park to the west, where enrollments were usually below capacity. Furthermore, in an effort to integrate faculties, the Board "designated schools in which the ratio of black to white teachers deviated by more than 10 percent from the citywide ratio," before voluntary teacher transfers took place, and new teachers were "assigned to schools on a color-conscious basis until the faculties in these schools were brought within the 10 percent limit." In the year following the decision, "Congress changed the method of choosing School Board members, providing for their election by the people of the District of Columbia," as opposed to their appointment. Hobson became an elected member.

With segregation, both de jure and de facto, declared unconstitutional, the opportunities for racial integration in schools were available. What remained was the ebbing of the ideology underlying de facto segregation. The resistance to a changing status quo was manifest in the ensuing decline in white enrollment, accelerated by the decision. Between 1967 and 1968, white enrollment in elementary schools dropped by 16% from 6,692 to 5,629, at "approximately twice the rate of decline of the preceding year and of the following several years."
