= 2225 N Street Apartment Building =

- U.S. National Register of Historic Places
- D.C. Inventory of Historic Sites
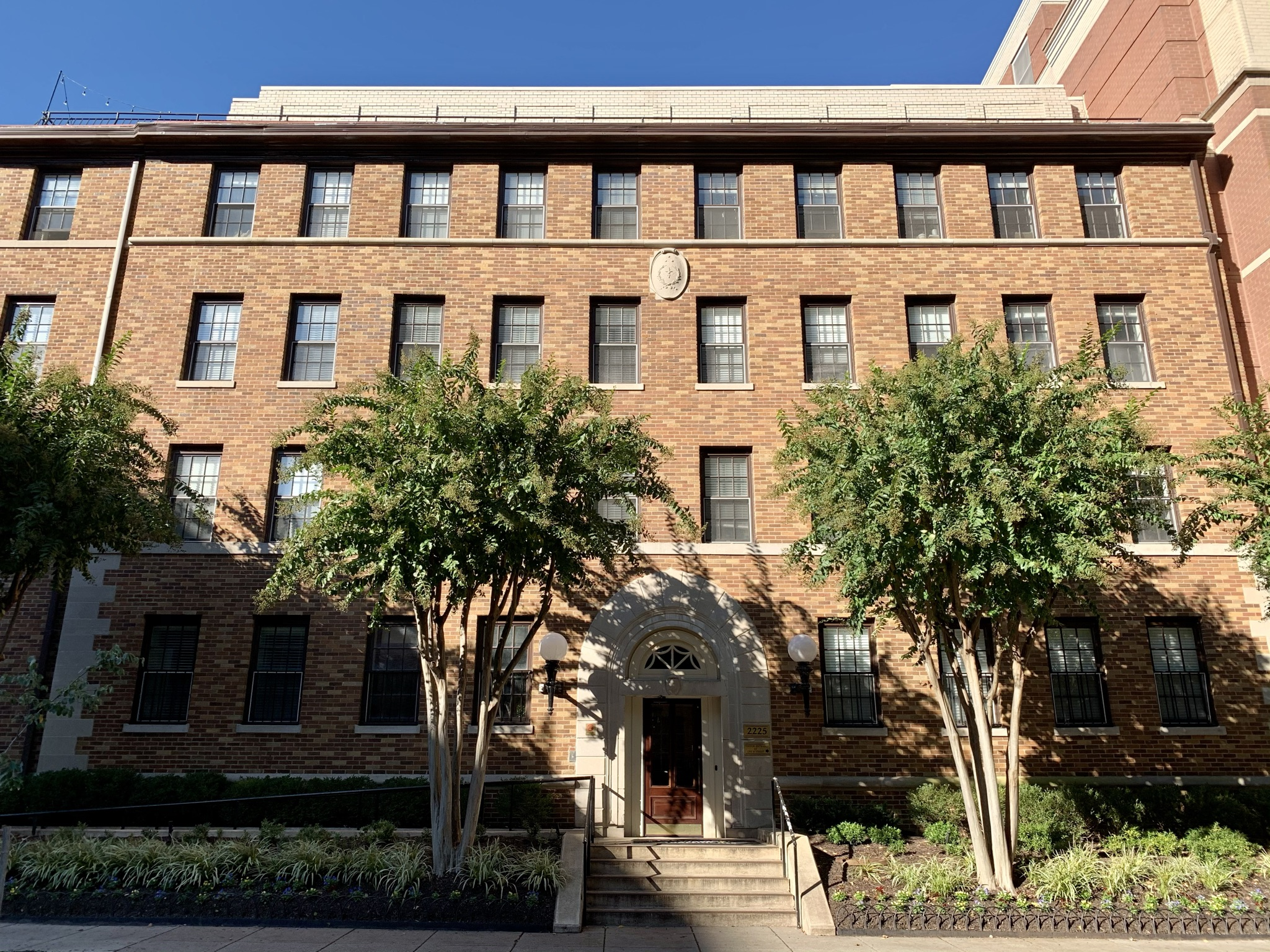
- 2225 N Street in 2020

- Location within Central Washington, D.C. Location within the District of Columbia Location within the United States
- Location: Washington, D.C.
- Coordinates: 38°54′27″N 77°3′0″W
- Built: 1924
- Architect: Harry Wardman, Eugene Waggaman
- Architectural style: Vernacular
- MPS: Apartment Buildings in Washington, DC, MPS
- NRHP reference No.: 94001043

Significant dates
- Added to NRHP: September 9, 1994
- Designated DCIHS: May 16, 1990

The 2225 N Street Apartment Building in the West End neighborhood of Northwest Washington, D.C., was constructed in 1924 by local real estate developers Harry Wardman and Eugene Waggaman. The building was added to the District of Columbia Inventory of Historic Sites in 1990 and the National Register of Historic Places in 1994.

== See also ==
- National Register of Historic Places in Washington, D.C.
