= List of United States Supreme Court cases, volume 206 =

Supreme Court of the United States
- Interactive map of Supreme Court of the United States
- 38°53′26″N 77°00′16″W
- Established: March 4, 1789; 236 years ago
- Location: Washington, D.C.
- Coordinates: 38°53′26″N 77°00′16″W
- Composition method: Presidential nomination with Senate confirmation
- Authorised by: Constitution of the United States, Art. III, § 1
- Judge term length: life tenure, subject to impeachment and removal
- Number of positions: 9 (by statute)
- Website: supremecourt.gov

This is a list of cases reported in volume 206 of United States Reports, decided by the Supreme Court of the United States in 1907.

== Justices of the Supreme Court at the time of volume 206 U.S. ==
The Supreme Court is established by Article III, Section 1 of the Constitution of the United States, which says: "The judicial Power of the United States, shall be vested in one supreme Court . . .". The size of the Court is not specified; the Constitution leaves it to Congress to set the number of justices. Under the Judiciary Act of 1789 Congress originally fixed the number of justices at six (one chief justice and five associate justices). Since 1789 Congress has varied the size of the Court from six to seven, nine, ten, and back to nine justices (always including one chief justice).

When the cases in volume 206 were decided the Court comprised the following nine members:

Portrait	Justice	Office	Home State	Succeeded	Date confirmed by the Senate (Vote)	Tenure on Supreme Court
	Melville Fuller	Chief Justice	Illinois	Morrison Waite	July 20, 1888 (41–20)	October 8, 1888 – July 4, 1910 (Died)
	John Marshall Harlan	Associate Justice	Kentucky	David Davis	November 29, 1877 (Acclamation)	December 10, 1877 – October 14, 1911 (Died)
	David Josiah Brewer	Associate Justice	Kansas	Stanley Matthews	December 18, 1889 (53–11)	January 6, 1890 – March 28, 1910 (Died)
	Edward Douglass White	Associate Justice	Louisiana	Samuel Blatchford	February 19, 1894 (Acclamation)	March 12, 1894 – December 18, 1910 (Continued as chief justice)
	Rufus W. Peckham	Associate Justice	New York	Howell Edmunds Jackson	December 9, 1895 (Acclamation)	January 6, 1896 – October 24, 1909 (Died)
	Joseph McKenna	Associate Justice	California	Stephen Johnson Field	January 21, 1898 (Acclamation)	January 26, 1898 – January 5, 1925 (Retired)
	Oliver Wendell Holmes Jr.	Associate Justice	Massachusetts	Horace Gray	December 4, 1902 (Acclamation)	December 8, 1902 – January 12, 1932 (Retired)
	William R. Day	Associate Justice	Ohio	George Shiras Jr.	February 23, 1903 (Acclamation)	March 2, 1903 – November 13, 1922 (Retired)
	William Henry Moody	Associate Justice	Massachusetts	Henry Billings Brown	December 12, 1906 (Acclamation)	December 17, 1906 – November 20, 1910 (Retired)

== Citation style ==
Under the Judiciary Act of 1789 the federal court structure at the time comprised District Courts, which had general trial jurisdiction; Circuit Courts, which had mixed trial and appellate (from the US District Courts) jurisdiction; and the United States Supreme Court, which had appellate jurisdiction over the federal District and Circuit courts—and for certain issues over state courts. The Supreme Court also had limited original jurisdiction (i.e., in which cases could be filed directly with the Supreme Court without first having been heard by a lower federal or state court). There were one or more federal District Courts and/or Circuit Courts in each state, territory, or other geographical region.

The Judiciary Act of 1891 created the United States Courts of Appeals and reassigned the jurisdiction of most routine appeals from the district and circuit courts to these appellate courts. The Act created nine new courts that were originally known as the "United States Circuit Courts of Appeals." The new courts had jurisdiction over most appeals of lower court decisions. The Supreme Court could review either legal issues that a court of appeals certified or decisions of court of appeals by writ of certiorari.

Bluebook citation style is used for case names, citations, and jurisdictions.

- "# Cir." = United States Court of Appeals
  - e.g., "3d Cir." = United States Court of Appeals for the Third Circuit
- "C.C.D." = United States Circuit Court for the District of . . .
  - e.g.,"C.C.D.N.J." = United States Circuit Court for the District of New Jersey
- "D." = United States District Court for the District of . . .
  - e.g.,"D. Mass." = United States District Court for the District of Massachusetts
- "E." = Eastern; "M." = Middle; "N." = Northern; "S." = Southern; "W." = Western
  - e.g.,"C.C.S.D.N.Y." = United States Circuit Court for the Southern District of New York
  - e.g.,"M.D. Ala." = United States District Court for the Middle District of Alabama
- "Ct. Cl." = United States Court of Claims
- The abbreviation of a state's name alone indicates the highest appellate court in that state's judiciary at the time.
  - e.g.,"Pa." = Supreme Court of Pennsylvania
  - e.g.,"Me." = Supreme Judicial Court of Maine

== List of cases in volume 206 U.S. ==
Case Name	Page & year	Opinion of the Court	Concurring opinion(s)	Dissenting opinion(s)	Lower Court	Disposition
Atlantic et al. R.R. Co. v. North Carolina Corp. Comm'n	1 (1907)	White	none	none	N.C.	affirmed
Hiscock v. Varick Bank	28 (1907)	Fuller	none	none	2d Cir.	affirmed
Chapman et al. Co. v. Bigelow	41 (1907)	Fuller	none	none	Ark.	dismissed
Kansas v. Colorado	46 (1907)	Brewer	none	none	original	dismissed
United States v. Cramp et al. Co.	118 (1907)	Brewer	none	none	Ct. Cl.	reversed
Adams E. Co. v. Kentucky I	129 (1907)	Brewer	none	none	Ky.	reversed
Adams E. Co. v. Kentucky II	138 (1907)	Brewer	none	none	Ky.	reversed
American Express Co. v. Kentucky	139 (1907)	Brewer	none	Harlan	Ky.	reversed
Cincinnati et al. R.R. Co. v. ICC	142 (1907)	White	none	none	C.C.S.D. Ohio	affirmed
Yates v. Jones Nat'l Bank	158 (1907)	White	none	none	Neb.	multiple
Yates v. Utica Bank	181 (1907)	White	none	none	Neb.	reversed
Stewart v. United States	185 (1907)	Peckham	none	none	Ct. Cl.	affirmed
Goat & S.I. Co. v. United States	194 (1907)	Peckham	none	none	2d Cir.	reversed
Lowrey v. Hawaii	206 (1907)	McKenna	none	none	Sup. Ct. Terr. Haw.	reversed
H.E. Frankenberg Co. v. United States	224 (1907)	McKenna	none	none	2d Cir.	affirmed
United States v. Farenholt	226 (1907)	McKenna	none	none	Ct. Cl.	affirmed
Georgia v. Tennessee C. Co.	230 (1907)	Holmes	Harlan	none	original	injunction issued
United States v. Brown	240 (1907)	Holmes	none	none	Ct. Cl.	affirmed
Ellis v. United States	246 (1907)	Holmes	none	Moody	D. Mass.	multiple
Stone v. Southern I. & M.B. Co.	267 (1907)	Day	none	none	Mo.	affirmed
Smith v. Jennings	276 (1907)	Moody	none	none	S.C.	dismissed
Wyoming ex rel. Wyoming A. Coll. v. Irvine	278 (1907)	Moody	none	none	Wyo.	affirmed
Kessler v. Eldred	285 (1907)	Moody	none	none	7th Cir.	certification
Virginia v. West Virginia	290 (1907)	Fuller	none	none	original	demurrer overruled
In re Pollitz	323 (1907)	Fuller	none	none	C.C.E.D. Mo.	mandamus denied
Grafton v. United States	333 (1907)	Harlan	none	none	Phil.	reversed
Love v. Flahive	356 (1907)	Brewer	none	none	Mont.	rehearing denied
Romeu v. Todd	358 (1907)	White	none	none	D.P.R.	reversed
United States v. Heinszen & Co.	370 (1907)	White	Harlan	none	Ct. Cl.	reversed
Buck v. Beach	392 (1907)	Peckham	none	Day	Ind.	reversed
Security W. Co. v. Hand	415 (1907)	Peckham	none	none	7th Cir.	affirmed
Southern R.R. Co. v. Tift	428 (1907)	McKenna	none	none	5th Cir.	affirmed
Illinois C.R.R. Co. v. ICC	441 (1907)	McKenna	none	none	C.C.E.D. La.	affirmed
United States v. Paine L. Co.	467 (1907)	McKenna	none	none	C.C.E.D. Wis.	affirmed
Copper Queen C.M. Co. v. Territorial Bd.	474 (1907)	Holmes	none	none	Sup. Ct. Terr. Ariz.	affirmed
Iowa R.R.L. Co. v. Blumer	482 (1907)	Day	none	none	Iowa	affirmed
City of Vicksburg v. Vicksburg W. Co.	496 (1907)	Day	none	none	C.C.S.D. Miss.	affirmed
Bernheimer v. Converse	516 (1907)	Day	none	Holmes	C.C.S.D.N.Y.	affirmed
Sauer v. City of New York	536 (1907)	Moody	none	McKenna	N.Y. Sup. Ct.	affirmed

== See also ==
- Certificate of division
