= Washington Marriott Wardman Park =

- Wardman Park Annex and Arcade
- U.S. National Register of Historic Places
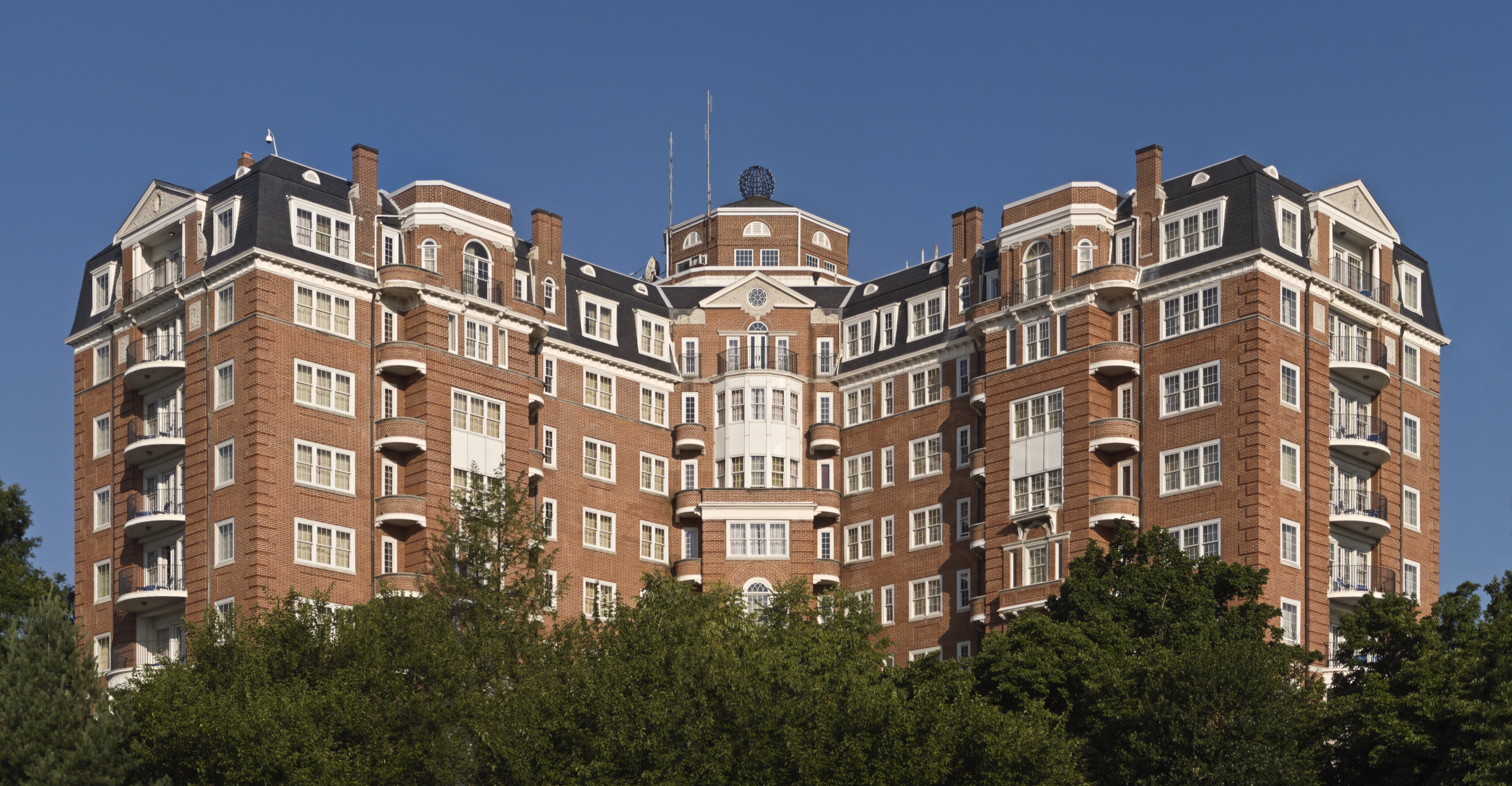
- Wardman Tower Condominiums, formerly part of the hotel

- Location within Washington, D.C. Location within the United States
- Location: 2600 Woodley Road NW, Washington, D.C.
- Coordinates: 38°55′30″N 77°3′13″W
- Area: 2.7 acres (1.1 ha)
- Built: 1928; 98 years ago
- Architect: Mihran Mesrobian
- Architectural style: Colonial Revival
- NRHP reference No.: 84000869 (original); 100003945 (increase)

Significant dates
- Added to NRHP: January 31, 1984; 42 years ago
- Boundary increase: May 10, 2019; 7 years ago

The Washington Marriott Wardman Park was a hotel on Connecticut Avenue next to the Woodley Park Station of the Washington Metro in the Woodley Park neighborhood of Washington, D.C., United States.

The hotel had 1,152 rooms, 195,000 square feet (18,100 m^{2}) of event space, and 95,000 square feet (8,800 m^{2}) of exhibit space. It opened in 1918 and closed in 2020, after which it was redeveloped into two residential towers.

The Wardman Tower wing, built in 1928, was added to the National Register of Historic Places in January 1984 and remains standing. It was redeveloped into condominiums.

== History ==
=== Original 1918 hotel structure ===
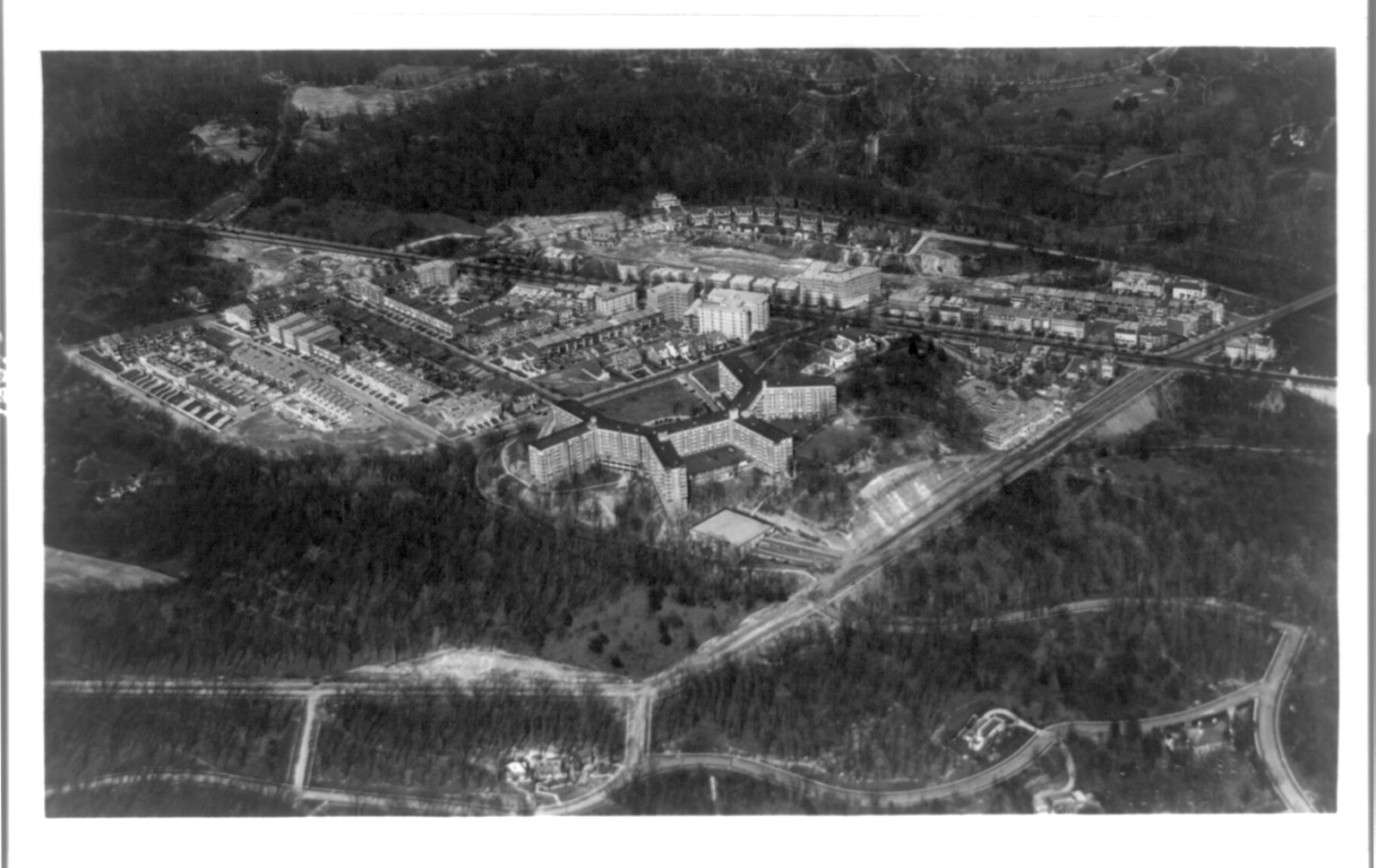
The original Wardman Park Hotel, in 1922, before the addition of the Wardman Tower.

The original hotel on the site was built between 1917 and 1918 by local developer Harry Wardman and was designed by local architect Frank Russell White. It was an eight-story, red brick structure modeled on The Homestead resort in Virginia. The hotel was the largest in the city, with 1,200 rooms and 625 baths. It was nicknamed Wardman's Folly, due to its location far outside the developed area of Washington at the time.

The hotel opened as the Wardman Park Inn on November 23, 1918, just days after the 1918 Armistice ended World War I. No elaborate opening festivities were held, since public gatherings were illegal during the Spanish flu pandemic. The hotel was hugely successful due to the housing shortage caused by the growth of Washington, D.C., during World War I. Within a year of its opening, the property was renamed the Wardman Park Hotel. It attracted prominent guests and tenants; foreign ambassadors, members of Congress, and Vice President Marshall took up residence.

In 1928, the hotel added an eight-story, 350-room residential-hotel annex designed by architect Mihran Mesrobian. That building, now converted into condominiums, is the only surviving portion of the original Wardman Park, known as the Wardman Tower, which is listed on the National Register of Historic Places. Wardman was forced to sell the hotel in 1931 due to the Great Depression, and the hotel was acquired by Washington Properties.

Before the United States entered World War II, a British spy named Cynthia operated out of the premises as she spied on the Vichy French Embassy. At night, she would visit her lover, an embassy employee whom she had compromised, and steal secret documents, transport them back to the hotel, and photograph them in a lab she had set up in her room.

The hotel contained a full-service drug store/pharmacy; the pharmacist was known as Doc Wardman. There was also a U.S. Post Office and shops in the basement, including a butcher, grocery store, and dry cleaner that was stocked even during World War II.

In the late 1940s, the Olympic-size swimming pool was used by the 5th Marine Reserves, who were taught how to swim with their clothes on.

The first televised broadcast of NBC's Meet the Press took place in 1947 in the Wardman Tower, where host Lawrence Spivak lived. Other shows broadcast from the hotel include The Camel News Caravan, The Today Show (Frank Blair segments), and The Arthur Murray Dance Program.

In 1953, Sheraton Hotels purchased Washington Properties Inc., owner of the Wardman Park Hotel and the Wardman-built Carlton Hotel. Renamed the Sheraton-Park Hotel, its focus shifted from longer-term residents to overnight guests. Substantial additions were made to the property, including large new ballrooms and a 1964 addition known as the Motor Inn and later known as the Park Tower.

In August 1962, Army Special Forces soldiers trained by rappelling down the side of the hotel.

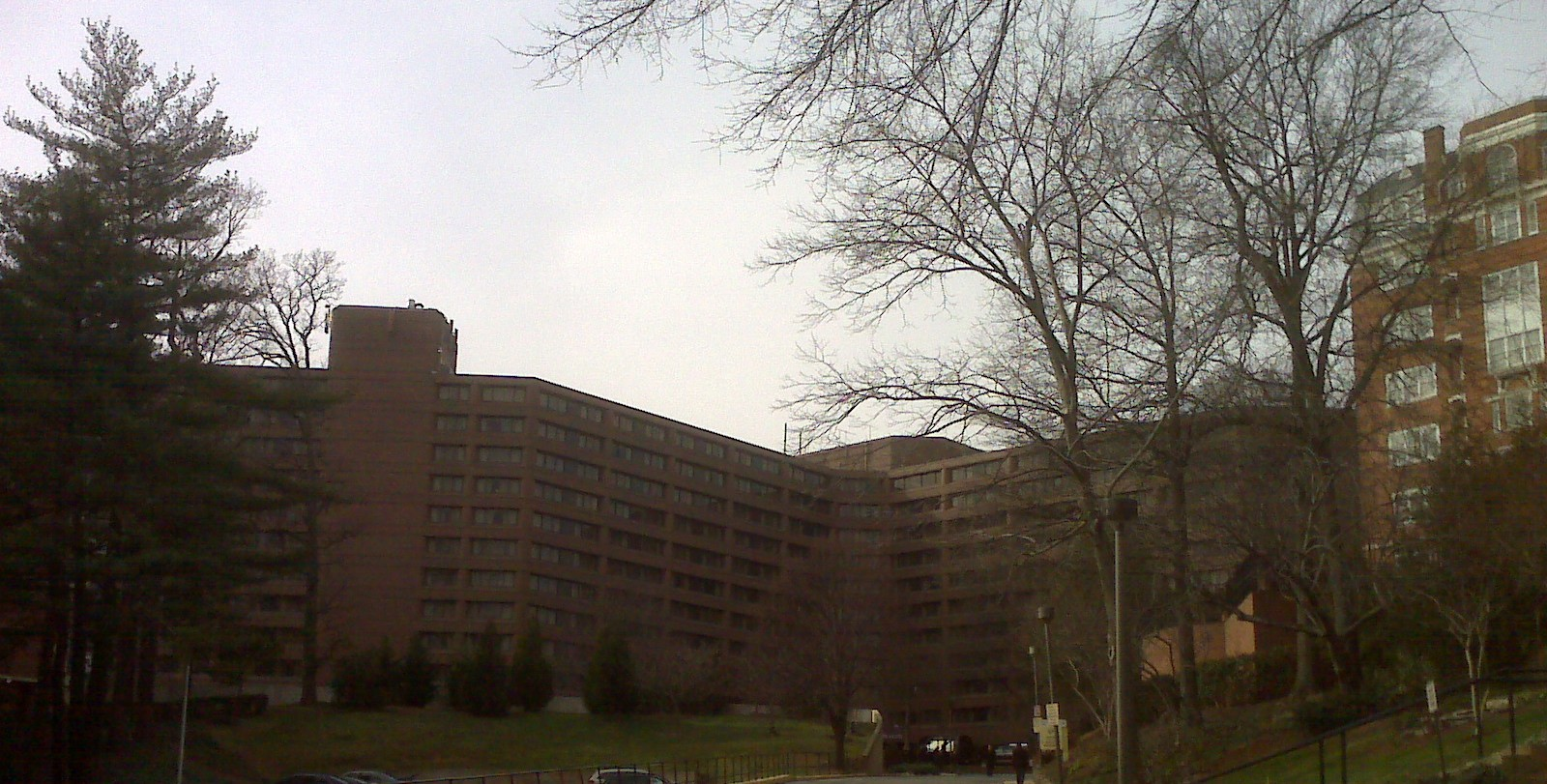
New main building of the hotel, completed in 1980.

In 1972, Sheraton began planning to replace the aging main wing of the hotel. In 1977, the company presented plans to local residents groups for a modern, 1,050-room hotel to be built on the 12-acre property. Construction began in early 1979. The furniture and fittings of the original 950-room 1918 structure were sold to the public in June 1979 and demolition of the original wing began on July 25, 1979, to allow further construction of the new wing. The 500 rooms in the Wardman Tower and Motor Inn wings remained open throughout construction. While construction was still underway, Sheraton sold an interest in the hotel to the John Hancock Life Insurance Company.

=== Second 1980 hotel structure ===
The partially completed new $104 million building opened in October 1979 as the Sheraton Washington Hotel, the largest hotel and convention complex on the East Coast. The new wing was fully completed and opened in August 1980.

On Election Night 1980, President Jimmy Carter conceded his landslide election loss to Ronald Reagan with a speech in the hotel ballroom.

In 1985, John Hancock bought out Sheraton's remaining interest in the hotel, but paid the chain to continue managing the property. In August 1997, John Hancock filed a breach-of-contract suit against the hotel chain, by then renamed ITT Sheraton, alleging mismanagement of the hotel. In March 1998, a federal judge in Delaware ordered ITT Sheraton to withdraw as manager of the hotel. Marriott International took over management of the property that month, renaming it the Marriott Wardman Park Hotel.

In January 1999, Thayer Lodging Group of Annapolis, Maryland, run by two former Marriott executives, purchased the hotel from John Hancock for $227 million and spent another $100 million on renovations.

In 2005, Thayer Lodging Group sold the hotel to JBG Smith and CIM Group for $300 million.

JBG planned to convert a portion of the hotel into luxury condominiums and construct a 200-unit condominium building on a 16-acre (65,000 m^{2}) lot next to the hotel. JBG also said it would demolish the hotel's parking garage and main ballroom, and spend $50 million to renovate the guest rooms, add dining space, build a new fitness center, and improve the exhibition and meeting space. Marriott, which managed the hotel, had the right to veto the conversion of hotel rooms into condos if revenues on the remaining hotel section fell below a specified number. Hotel revenues declined during the Great Recession, and Marriott exercised its right to stop the conversion of the hotel into condominiums. A lawsuit was settled in July 2010, allowing construction of the condominium to resume.

Due to the 2008 financial crisis, JBG constructed an apartment building on the vacant acreage rather than condominiums. D.C.-based architect David M. Schwarz designed an eight-story, 212-unit building for the company. Originally called Wardman West, the name was later changed to 2700 Woodley and then later to The Woodley. In June 2014, after the building was completed, but before it was leased, JBG sold The Woodley for $195 million, or $920,000 per unit, to TIAA-CREF, which set a record for the highest price-per-unit ever paid for a multifamily project in the D.C. metropolitan area.

In 2015, JBG renovated floors 3 to 8 of the Wardman Tower into 32 luxury condominiums, while the first and second floors remained part of the hotel business. The project was financed by $54 million from North America Sekisui House LLC (NASH), the North American division of the largest homebuilding corporation in Japan. One of the condominium units sold for $8.4 million. In 2020, Wardman Tower Condominium Unit Owners Association sued JBG Smith over undisclosed issues including faulty elevators and HVAC systems. A court awarded the association $118.7 million, which was tripled to $356 million per the D.C. Consumer Protection Procedures Act. JBG appealed the verdict.

In January 2018, JBG Group and CIM Group, which had owned roughly equal interests in the hotel, sold a controlling interest in the property (66.67%) to Pacific Life, with JBG and CIM each retaining 16.67% ownership. In February 2020, CIM Group sold its interest in the hotel.

In June 2020, during COVID-19 pandemic, the owners of the hotel planned to close it permanently. In September 2020, Pacific Life petitioned in a Delaware court to dissolve its ownership partnership with JBG. The two companies resolved their dispute in October 2020.

In October 2020, Marriott sued Pacific Life (which owned 80% of the property) and JBG Smith (which owned 20%). Marriott claimed the two companies were intentionally failing to invest contractually obligated capital in the hotel to force the property to close so it could be redeveloped, cheating Marriott of fees to be earned from its long-term management contract. In October 2020, JBG Smith transferred its ownership stake in the hotel to Pacific Life with a zero value.

In January 2021, the owning entity, Pacific Life subsidiary Wardman Hotel Owner LLC, filed for bankruptcy, announced that the hotel would be closed permanently, and ended its management contract with Marriott. In December 2021, the property was sold in a 192-round bankruptcy auction to Carmel Partners for $152.2 million, with plans for redevelopment.

Demolition of the main 1980 wing began in October 2022 and was completed in mid-2023. The redevelopment, which includes two residential towers, opened in 2025; rents are as high as $13,000/month.

== Residents ==
The Wardman Tower building was home to several politicians and other world public figures:

- President Lyndon B. Johnson for about 45 days as Vice President of the United States
- Vice President of the United States Spiro Agnew
- Vice President of the United States Charles Curtis
- Actress Marlene Dietrich
- Senator Bob Dole
- President of the United States Dwight D. Eisenhower
- Former airline Trans World Airlines (TWA) President Jack Frye and wife, Helen
- U.S. Attorney Paul M. Gagnon
- Senator Barry Goldwater
- Secretary of State Cordell Hull
- President of the United States Herbert Hoover
- Socialite Perle Mesta
- Publisher Lawrence Spivak
- Senator Chuck Robb
- Chief Justice Frederick M. Vinson
- Vice President of the United States Henry A. Wallace
- Chief Justice Earl Warren
- Senator Milton Young
- Senator Prescott Bush
- Senator Prentiss M. Brown
- Former Peruvian Ambassador to the United States Celso Pastor de la Torre and family
- Inventor Emile Berliner
- David Eisenhower and Julie Nixon Eisenhower, (Summer of 1970)
- President of the British Cartographic Society Dr Alexander Kent, (Summer of 2017)
- Vice President of the United States Thomas R. Marshall lived for a short time in the Wardman Park Hotel that was destroyed in 1980
- Major League Baseball player (1911–12) and lawyer, Harry Lee Spratt

== Events ==
The Marriott Wardman Park hosted many annual events including:

- The Association of American Law Schools' entry-level hiring conference, colloquially known as the "meat market".
- Conservative Political Action Conference
- International Telecommunications Week (ITW) trade show and idea summit
- American Intellectual Property Law Association (AIPLA) annual meeting
- Anime USA, an anime convention

The hotel was included in the rotation of cities in which the American Contract Bridge League holds North American Bridge Championship tournaments.

The annual meeting of the Transportation Research Board was held at the Marriott Wardman Park for nearly 60 years. It was moved to the Walter E. Washington Convention Center in 2015.

In March 2017, Cvent, an event management company, ranked the Marriott Wardman Park at 87th in its annual list of the top U.S. hotels for meetings.
