= Ellis v. United States (1969) =

United States Court of Appeals for the District of Columbia Circuit case

- Court: United States Court of Appeals for the District of Columbia Circuit
- Full case name: James H. Ellis, Jr. v. United States of America
- Argued: December 13, 1968
- Decided: April 30, 1969
- Citation: 416 F.2d 791

Court membership
- Judges sitting: John A. Danaher, J. Skelly Wright, Harold Leventhal

Case opinions
- Majority: Leventhal
- Concur/dissent: Danaher
- Dissent: Wright

Laws applied
- U.S. Const. amend. V

Ellis v. United States of America, 416 F.2d 791 (D.C. Cir. 1969), is a case decided by the United States Court of Appeals, District of Columbia Circuit, in 1969. It addressed the question of a witness's refusal to testify on Fifth Amendment grounds. The court concluded that when a non-indicted witness who has waived their Fifth Amendment privilege by testifying voluntarily before a grand jury and with knowledge of their privilege, their waiver extends to a subsequent trial based on an indictment returned by the grand jury that heard their testimony.

== The crime ==
At around midnight of August 1, 1967, in the District of Columbia, police officers arrested three suspects named Izzard, Jackson, and James H. Ellis Jr. The latter two were carrying molotov cocktails. A fourth suspect, Alfred M. Watkins, escaped but was later taken into custody.

According to Izzard's testimony before the original trial's grand jury, Ellis had shattered a window with a rock, Jackson then threw two molotov cocktails through the window, and Watkins had then thrown a third molotov cocktail, which started a fire in the store.

The four men had then created six more molotov cocktails with the intention of starting another fire, but the police intervened before they could do so.

== Trial ==
At the original trial, Ellis and Watkins were convicted of arson and of possessing a lethal weapon.

== Appeal ==
The appellants, Ellis and Watkins, filed an appeal in the District of Columbia Court of Appeals. It was argued on December 13, 1968, and decided on April 30, 1969. The judges were John A. Danaher, J. Skelly Wright, and Harold Leventhal.

=== Appellants' argument ===
Ellis and Watkins sought reversal at the appellate level on the ground that the trial judge had erred in compelling Izzard's testimony. At first, after being advised of his right against self-incrimination, Izzard had declined to testify, but the prosecutor had urged that Izzard be compelled to testify, noting that he had waived his privilege before the grand jury and arguing that there could be no prejudice if Izzard simply repeated his testimony for the record. The judge, while rejecting the contention that the waiver of privilege before the grand jury applied as well to subsequent proceedings, concluded, on the basis of Murphy v. Waterfront Commission, that there was no reason not to compel Izzard's testimony.

== Ruling ==
Leventhal, with Danaher agreeing, declined to reverse the trial judge's verdict, because although the judge, in their view, had erred by citing Murphy, his decision to compel Izzard to testify was nonetheless sustainable on the grounds that Izzard had already testified before the grand jury.

=== Leventhal's opinion ===
Leventhal held that the trial judge had erred in requiring Izzard to testify on the basis of Murphy v. Waterfront Commission, and had also erred in rejecting the prosecutor's argument that the claim of privilege at trial could be overruled in view of Izzard's voluntary grand jury testimony. While Murphy did protect the witness, according to Leventhal, the trial judge's ruling had amounted to “a circular, self-fulfilling prophecy” that in effect constituted “a grant of immunity” that was “outside the scope of judicial authority.” Further, Leventhal maintained, the appellants did, contrary to the original judge's ruling, have standing to object to the judge's usurpation of prerogative.

Leventhal emphasized the “need for a stern restraint on judges to stay within the judicial province.” While a defendant does not, as a rule, “have standing to complain of an erroneous ruling on the scope of the privilege of a witness,” a defendant may “complain that his conviction was obtained in a case where the trial judge went outside his judicial province to grant immunity to a witness.” In support of this assertion, Leventhal cited Barrows v. Jackson and Griswold v. Connecticut.

Leventhal summed up his position by saying that “a witness who voluntarily testifies before a grand jury without invoking the privilege against self-incrimination, of which he has been advised, waives the privilege and may not thereafter claim it when he is called to testify as a witness at the trial on the indictment returned by the grand jury, where the witness is not the defendant, or under indictment.”

=== Danaher's concurrence/dissent ===
Judge Danaher concurred in Part C of Judge Leventhal's opinion, agreeing that the convictions of Ellis and Watkins should be affirmed, but disagreed with the statements about Izzard made by Leventhal in Parts A and B of his opinion. “As a companion in the crime of arson, directly participating with these appellants in the events leading to their apprehension and conviction,” wrote Danaher, “Izzard owed the public duty to testify which every person within the jurisdiction of government is bound to perform.” Danaher also emphasized that it was not Izzard but the appellants who had lodged a complaint, effectively claiming “that his rights became their rights, and that a violation of his rights requires a reversal of their convictions.” This was unacceptable, argued Danaher, because “Where the witness is not the party, the party may not claim the privilege nor take advantage of an error of the court in overruling it.”

=== Wright's dissent ===
In contrast to Judge Danaher, Judge Wright agreed with Parts A and B of Leventhal's opinion, but dissented from Part C and the judgment of affirmance. His view was that “the Fifth Amendment not only protects against the risk of prosecution on evidence extorted from the defendant, but also establishes a right to abstain from the demeaning ritual of public self-accusation.” He quoted Justice Douglas's statement, in a dissent on Ullmann v. United States, that the Fifth Amendment “protects the conscience and the dignity of the individual, as well as his safety and security, against the compulsion of government.” Noting that Izzard had “waive[d] his right to silence in the privacy of the grand jury hearing” but asserted it in open court, Wright stated that “[t]he different circumstances of the two proceedings make his decision entirely explicable in terms of those considerations of human dignity which the Fifth Amendment was designed in part to protect.”
