= Northumberland Apartments =

- U.S. National Register of Historic Places
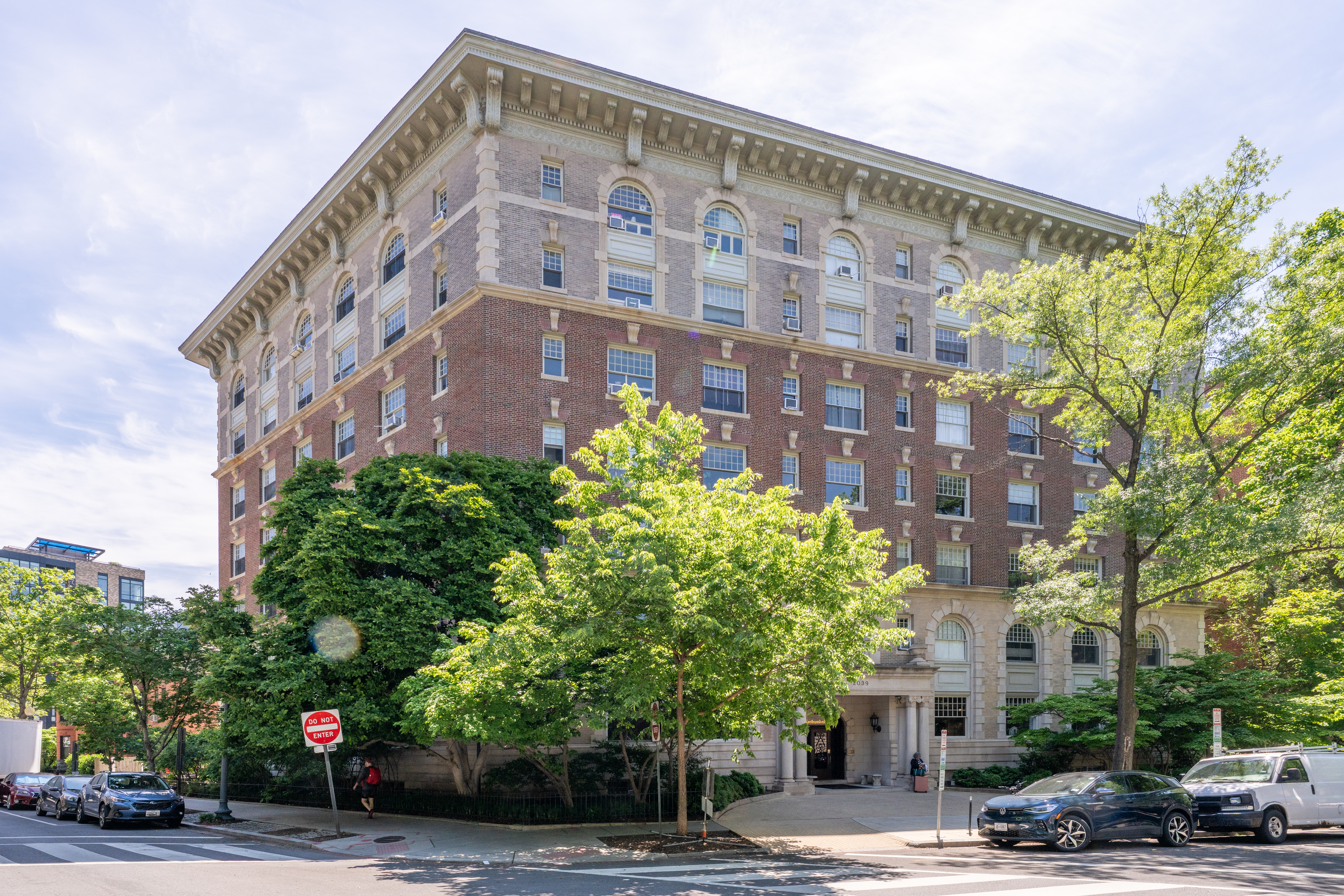

- Location within Washington, D.C.
- Location: 2039 New Hampshire Avenue NW, Washington, D.C.
- Coordinates: 38°55′4″N 77°2′9″W
- Area: 0.4 acres (0.16 ha)
- Built: 1909
- Architect: Albert H. Beers, Harry Wardman
- Architectural style: Classical Revival
- NRHP reference No.: 80004304
- Added to NRHP: March 25, 1980

The Northumberland Apartments is a historic apartment building in the U Street Corridor of Washington, D.C. The Classical Revival building was constructed in 1909-10 by local real estate developer Harry Wardman and Albert H. Beers. In 1980, the building was placed on the National Register of Historic Places.

== Siting ==
The Northumberland Apartments occupies a significant lot on New Hampshire Avenue, N.W. The irregular shape of the lot, created by the intersection of this major diagonal avenue and the grid of L'Enfant's 1791 plan for the Federal City, dictated the shape of the building. The Northumberland's eclectic, classical facade blends harmoniously with the buildings in the area and contributes to the visual variety and richness of the New Hampshire Avenue streetscape between Sixteenth Street and Florida Avenue. The building remains an unaltered element in a neighborhood identity created by Victorian rowhouses, large apartment buildings, and churches and institutional buildings. The variety of building types and styles, and the unusual spatial configuration of the short blocks and irregularly-shaped lots, creates a richness of streetscape seldom found so intact in the city today.

== Design ==
=== Exterior ===
Beers designed the Northumberland in an eclectic early-twentieth century adaptation of eighteenth-century classicism. Its design and conception were French in origin, illustrating Beers' familiarity with the current fashion in apartment design. The quality of construction, materials, and craftsmanship found in the building is exceptionally high. The Northumberland stands in its original state; this unaltered condition contributes significantly to the building's importance. The Northumberland is perhaps the only such example of an early-twentieth century luxury apartment building left intact in Washington.

The Northumberland is approached by a semi-circular driveway. The building is red and white brick and dressed limestone and features an eclectic collection of classical architectural elements. The facade is divided into three horizontal bands. The upper and lower bands are white brick and stone and are each two stories high. The configuration of the fenestration is the same on both levels, although the scale is smaller in the upper band. The windows are paired vertically - an arched window above a square one - and contained within a quoined Gibbs surround that encompasses the windows and the spandrel between. Similar limestone quoins are also found at the corners of the two bands.

The middle band of three floors is rough red brick. The rectangular windows are large and are capped by pressed brick jack arches with stone console keystones. A metal bracketed cornice forms a projecting cap for the building and defines the roofline. The variety of the materials and textures contribute to the appearance of the Northumberland. Other detailing, including limestone ledges and quoins, add a decorative element.

Perhaps the most distinctive feature of the facade is the Palladian-inspired recessed entry. The curved space, framed by two pairs of Ionic columns and pilasters, is 16 feet (4.9 m) high and over 22 feet (6.7 m) wide. Above is a 4-foot (1.2 m) high entablature capped by two classical stone urns. The wide door, with its elliptical fanlight and sidelights, is set in a deep niche.

The fenestration plays a major role in determining the feeling of the facade. The windows are unusually large for the period, some measuring over 6 feet 6 inches (1.98 m) square. The variety of sash types, including 16/1, add to the richness of the design. Consoles and metal ornamentation provide additional embellishment. The consoles are two types - metal under the projecting cornice and limestone above the windows. The Former are decorated with deeply chased acanthus leaves. The latter are classical in style and serve as the keystones in the jack arches above the windows. Other decorative metal details include four types of molding (dentil, egg and dart, ogee, and plain), a large floral frieze, and chamfered metal panels.

=== Interior ===
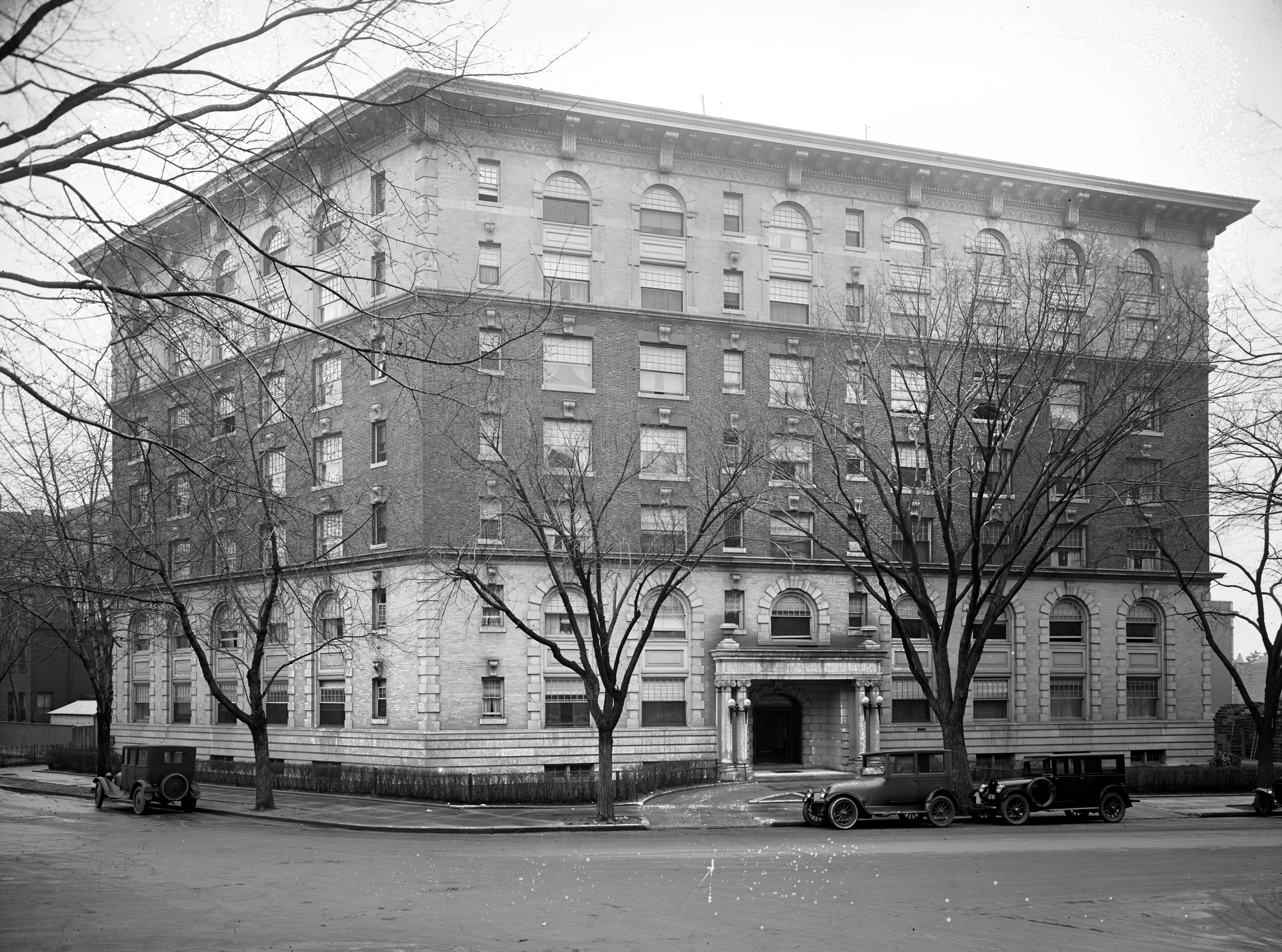
Northumberland Apartments in 1920

The exterior of the Northumberland, in spite of its variety of materials and architectural elements, hardly prepares one for the explosion of decorative features and materials in the main public space of the building. The lobby has been described as unique among Wardman's many buildings. Some connoisseurs of architectural history consider it the most distinctive lobby in the city. Eclectic in design and decoration, it reflects the taste in vogue in New York City luxury apartments at the turn of the 20th century. It boasts two huge fireplaces and four columns with ornamental capitals. The staircase and lighting fixtures exhibit fine handwrought iron work. The central staircase, with white-grey marble steps, branches at the landing with separate marbleized staircases leading to each wing of the building. The three stairways are well related visually. Facing the entrance at the first landing are three original curved stained glass windows with heraldic monograms (the initial N). The two fireplaces, which face one another, are 6 feet 2 inches (1.88 m) high, 9 feet (2.7 m) wide, and 1 1/2 feet (0.46 m) deep.

The construction is wood, marbleized to match the color of the walls. The two marbleized staircases curve slightly and extend 6 feet 2 inches (1.88 m) from the lobby to the first floor. Each is headed by a finial in the form of an obelisk 5 feet 7 inches (1.70 m) tall, containing six marble steps, and six unusually shaped balusters. Quasi columns form the end of the staircases, complete with eclectic capitals and elements of decoration that form part of the over-all lobby pattern. An elegant arch highlights the entrance to the corridors. The main staircase to the first landing has thirteen marble steps. The lobby floor consists of the same ceramic tile and decorative pattern as is found in the corridors. The transom over the door is in the form of an arc and is decorated with an impressive marbleized border.

The lobby of the Northumberland is distinguished by a wealth of decorative ornamentation associated with European architectural embellishments derived from classical, medieval, gothic, and renaissance motifs. Its great size (44 by 26 feet (13.4 m × 7.9 m) and height (13 feet [4.0 m]) allowed the architect and builder great freedom in designing the motifs that make up the decoration. The marbleized walls, columns, side staircases, and fireplaces provide an elegant background for the ornamentation. The yellowish color of the imitation marble blends harmoniously with the basic buff color of the decorative plasterwork, accentuated with touches of gilt.

== See also ==
- National Register of Historic Places listings in Washington, D.C.
