= 23rd Scripps National Spelling Bee =

Spelling bee held in the United States in 1950

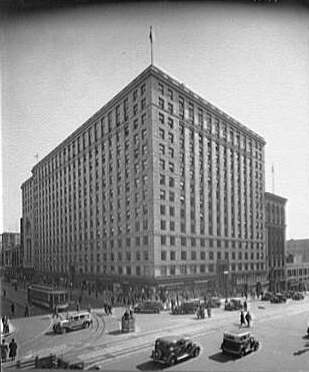
- National Press Building
- Date: Friday, May 26, 1950
- Location: Washington, D.C.
- Winner: Diana Reynard and Colquitt Dean (tie) (12 (Reynard); 14 (Dean) at time of win)
- Sponsor: Cleveland Press (Reynard); Atlanta Journal (Dean)
- Sponsor location: Cleveland, Ohio (Reynard); Atlanta, Georgia (Dean)
- Winning word: meticulosity
- No. of contestants: 50
- Pronouncer: Benson S. Alleman

The 23rd Scripps National Spelling Bee was held in Washington, District of Columbia on Friday, May 26, 1950, sponsored by the E.W. Scripps Company, at the National Press Club auditorium.

The co-winners were 12-year-old Diana Reynard of East Cleveland, Ohio and 14-year-old Colquitt Dean of College Park, Georgia. This was the first time in National Spelling Bee history that the word list was exhausted and co-champions had to be declared. The final word was meticulosity. Each received the first place prize of $500 and a trip to New York. Third place went to Jim Bernhard of Houston, Texas, who missed "haruspex", and received $300.

The field of spellers was reduced to Reynard and Dean after 29 rounds, and they both correctly spelled a number of following words. Dean was almost excluded on "ferule" until the judges determined it was a proper spelling. The two continued until the Bee's third and final supplementary word list had been used up. Dean politely refused requests to embrace Reynard for photographers, fearing the reaction it might cause back home to be seen hugging a girl.

There were 50 spellers that year – 31 girls and 19 boys. Audrey Mathews was the first one eliminated for the spelling "supercede", but was reinstated after the judges found that it was listed in Webster's dictionary as a variant spelling for the normal "supersede".
