= Ellis v. United States (1907) =

- Supreme Court of the United States

Argued April 23, 24, 1907 Decided May 13, 1907
- Full case name: William H. Ellis v. United States of America, et al Eastern Dredging Company v. United States; Bay State Dredging Company v. United States
- Citations: 206 U.S. 246 (more) 27 S.Ct. 600; 51 L. Ed. 1047; 1907 U.S. LEXIS 1160

Court membership
- Chief Justice Melville Fuller Associate Justices John M. Harlan · David J. Brewer; Edward D. White · Rufus W. Peckham; Joseph McKenna · Oliver W. Holmes Jr. William R. Day · William H. Moody

Case opinions
- Majority: Holmes, joined by Fuller, Brewer, White, Peckham
- Concurrence: McKenna
- Dissent: Moody, joined by Harlan, Day

Ellis v. United States, 206 U.S. 246 (1907), is a court case that was ultimately decided by the U.S. Supreme Court. The case, which was identified as case No. 567, was argued in conjunction with three cases entitled Eastern Dredging Company v. United States (Nos. 664, 665, and 666) and three cases entitled Bay State Dredging Company v. United States (Nos. 667, 668, and 669).

All seven cases concerned the issue of whether the federal government had the power to limit the number of hours worked per day by federal workers or employees of federal contractors. In its judgment, the Supreme Court upheld a federal law limiting the hours worked by such persons.

The cases were originally addressed by the District Court of the United States for the District of Massachusetts. They were argued before the U.S. Supreme Court on April 23 and 24, 1907, and decided on May 13, 1907.

D. T. Watson argued for the plaintiff in No. 567; Edward E. Blodgett and G. Philip Wardner argued for the plaintiff in Nos. 664, 665, 666; W. Orison Underwood, Henry F. Knight, and Johnson, Clapp, & Underwood argued for the plaintiff in Nos. 667, 668, 669. Solicitor General Hoyt, Attorney General Bonaparte, and Mr. Otis J. Carlton argued for the defendant.

== Background ==
The plaintiffs had been found guilty under the Act of August 1, 1892, c. 352, 27 Stat. 340, “Relating to the Limitation of the Hours of Daily Service of Laborers and Mechanics Employed upon the Public Works of the United States and of the District of Columbia.”

In Ellis's case, No. 567, the plaintiff had agreed to construct a pier at the Boston Navy Yard within six months. When work fell behind he had his men work for nine hours a day instead of eight.

The Eastern Dredging Company was hired to dredge a portion of the channel in Boston Harbor, and the Bay State Dredging Company was engaged to dredge Chelsea Creek in Boston Harbor. The three Eastern Dredging cases were as follows: No. 664 involved the employment of two deck hands and an assistant craneman and deck hand; No. 665, the employment of a master, craneman, and fireman; and No. 666, the employment of the captain, mate, engineer, and foreman of a tug and a man in charge of a scow. Of the Bay State Dredging cases, No. 667 involved the employment of a captain, mate, and fireman; No. 668, the employment of a craneman and deck hand; and No. 669, the employment of a scowman and the captain and engineer of a tug.

The plaintiffs challenged the constitutionality of the act under which they had been found guilty, which limited all laborers and mechanics employed by the United States, by the District of Columbia, or by their public-works contractors or subcontractors, to eight hours a day except in emergency situations. The two dredging firms also challenged the applicability of the law to the activity of dredging, as opposed to building.

== Court's opinion ==
Justice Holmes found that while the contention of unconstitutionality was not frivolous, the act was justified. Citing Atkin v. Kansas, 191 U.S. 207, which upheld the right of a state to pass similar laws, he wrote: “We see no reason to deny to the United States the power thus established for the States.” Another contention of the plaintiffs was that “the Government waived its sovereignty by making a contract, and that even if the Act of 1892 were read into the contract, a breach of its requirements would be only a breach of contract and could not be made a crime.” Holmes called this contention “a mere confusion of ideas,” explaining that “The Government purely as contractor, in the absence of special laws, may stand like a private person, but by making a contract it does not give up its power to make a law.”

Holmes did, however, accept the claim by the two dredging companies that some of the men employed by them did not strictly qualify as “laborers and mechanics” and “were not employed upon any of the public works of the United States within the meaning of the act.” In other words, he accepted that the distinction between employing construction workers to build a pier on land and employing seamen to dredge a channel in a waterway was significant enough that the former activity fell within the purview of the act while the latter activity did not. He therefore affirmed the judgment in the case against Ellis while reversing the judgments in 664 through 669.

Justice Moody took no part in the decision on the Ellis case, and dissented on 664 through 669, a dissent in which he was joined by Justices Harlan and Day.

Justice McKenna felt that the work in Chelsea Creek fell within the scope of the act, but otherwise agreed with the court's judgment.

== Justice Moody's dissent ==
Justice Moody argued that the dredging of channels did indeed fall within the scope of the act. He argued that the channels were indeed “public works,” and that it was unreasonable to think that the legislators who had written the act in question had intended that men who work on a pier “should work only eight hours a day, while those who work nearby on the channel itself should be exempted from this restriction.”

He acknowledged that seamen were “not laborers or mechanics” and, when working at sea, could not practicably “be brought within the limits of an eight-hour day,” but he added that when a seaman is hired to do other work, such as dredging along the coast, he is not working as a seaman but can in fact be described as a “laborer or mechanic.” Justice Moody did not find it meaningful for the purposes of the case that “the scows and dredges were vessels, or those employed upon them for some purposes are deemed seamen”; rather, what mattered was what kind of work the men were engaged in while employed by the appellants.
