= Harry Wardman =

American real estate developer (1872–1938)

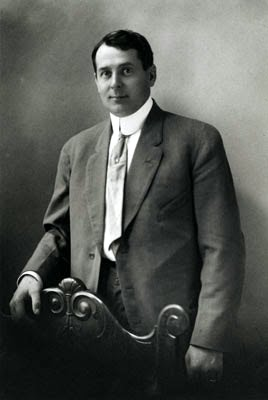
Harry Wardman in 1895

Harry Wardman (April 11, 1872 – March 18, 1938) was an American real estate developer in Washington, D.C. during the early 20th century whose developments included landmark hotels, luxury apartment buildings, and many rowhouses. When he died in 1938, one-tenth of the residents of Washington were said to live in a Wardman-built home.

== Personal life ==
Born in Bradford, England in 1872 (the 1900 federal census - Washington, D.C. - says he was born April 1869), Wardman was the son of English textile workers. In 1889, at age 17, he arrived in New York City, where he worked in a department store. He later moved to Philadelphia, where he worked at the Wanamaker's department store and met his wife, Mary Hudson. They had one daughter, Alice. In 1898, he apprenticed himself to a local carpenter to learn construction. By 1900, Wardman was widowed. In 1902, Wardman moved to Washington, D.C., where he worked as a carpenter, learned to build staircases, and soon got into building homes and apartments. In 1908, he married Lillian Glascox. Harry and Lillian had one daughter, Helen.

== Building career ==
=== Rowhouses ===
The first independent project Wardman embarked upon was a six-house ensemble in Sixteenth Street Heights, on Longfellow Street, in 1898; while the term did not exist yet, these were what would later be termed "rowhouses". The success of the Longfellow Street project pushed Wardman to scale this model up in Columbia Heights, in 1907, wherein he built blocks of rowhouses branching east and west off of Fourteenth Street, between Monroe Street and Spring Street. These 750 rowhouses included new design elements, most notably the front porch. Wardman built many of the city's rowhouses, especially in the neighborhoods of Columbia Heights, Bloomingdale, Eckington and Fort Stevens Ridge. To this day, his homes are renowned for their high-quality construction and materials. Some of his design ideas were copied by the dozens of other developers — Lewis Brueninger, Harry Kite, Francis Blundon, David Dunigan, and others — who built massive rows of townhouses in the District.

=== Apartments ===
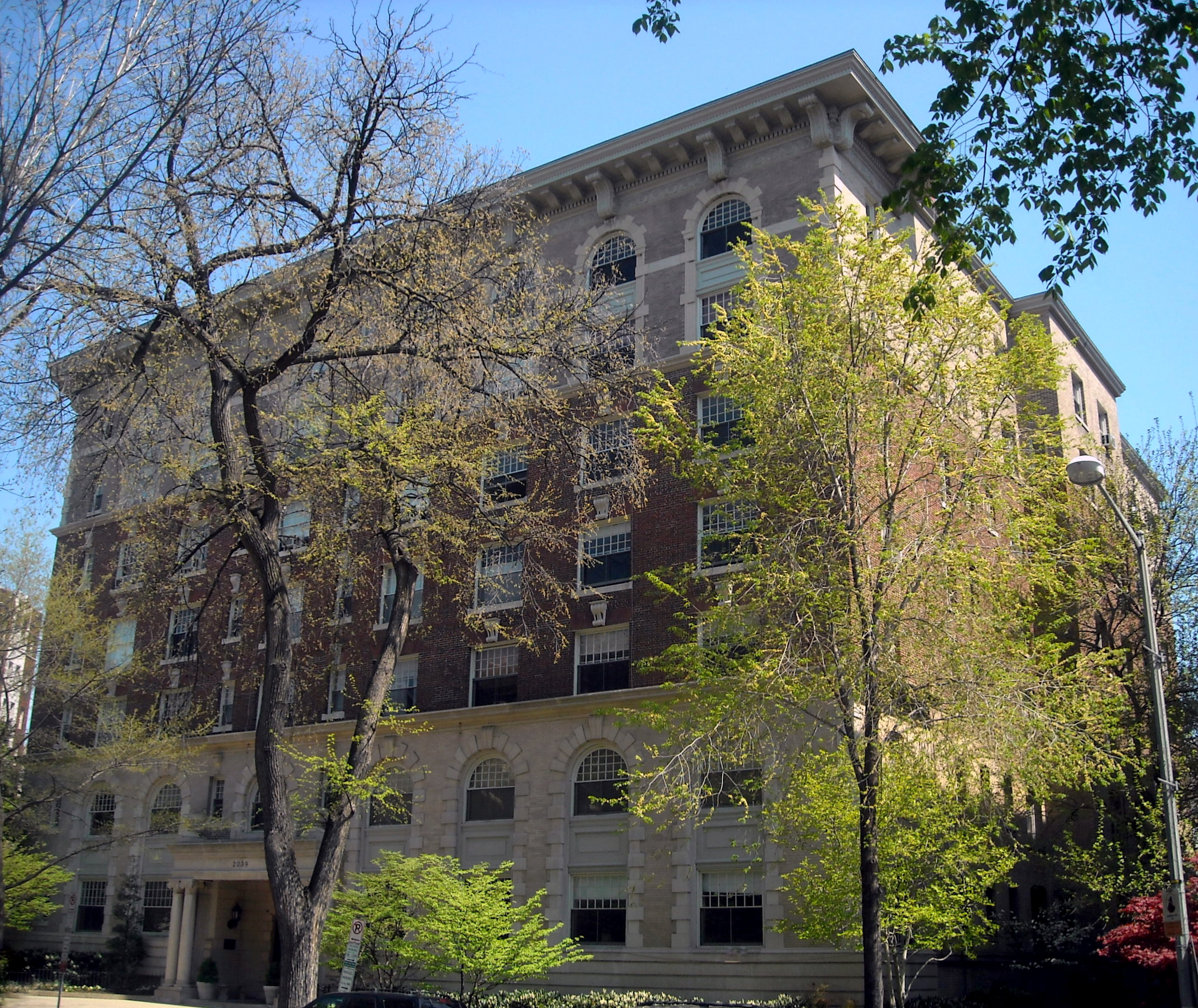
Northumberland Apartments

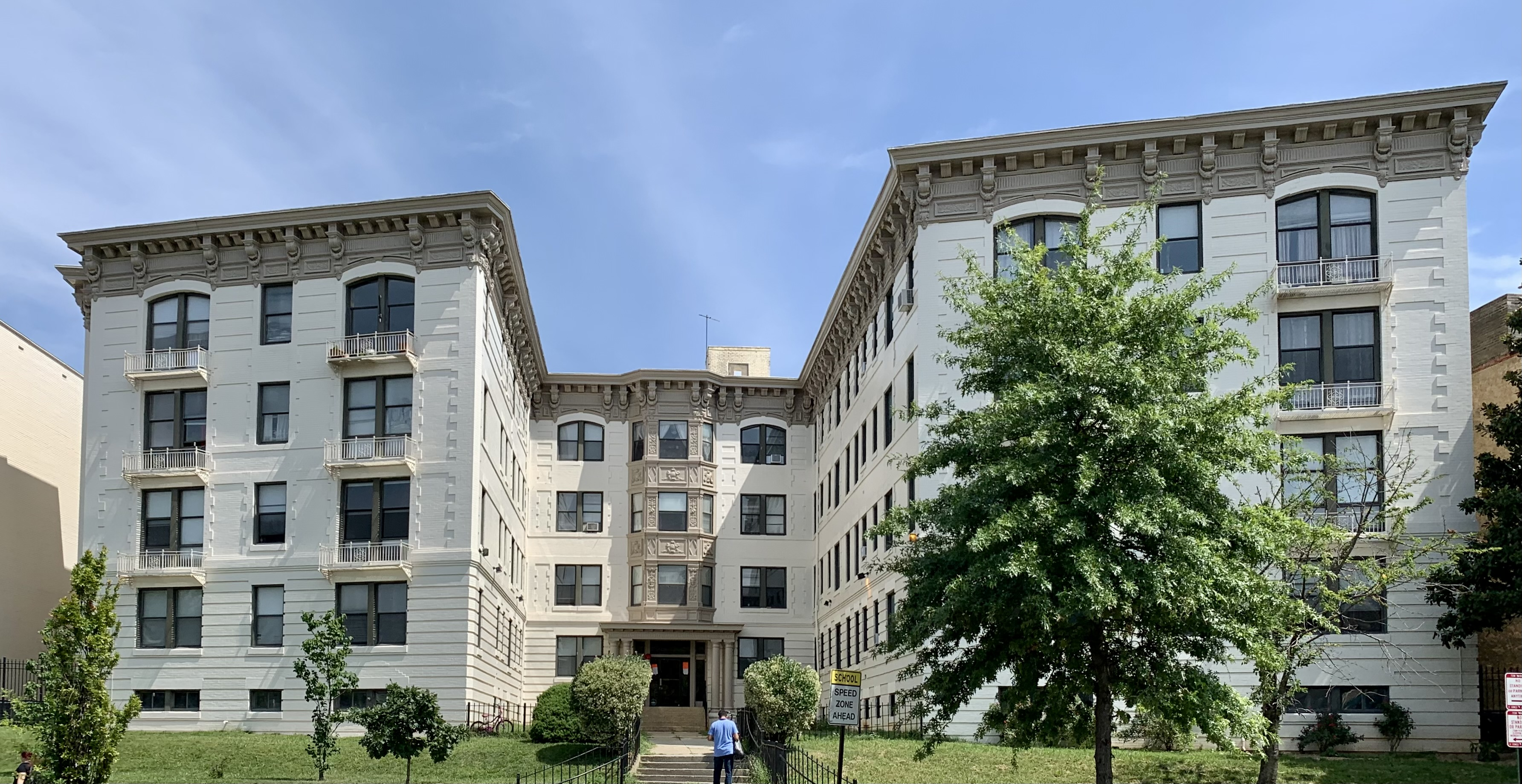
The Claiborne was designed by Albert H. Beers in 1908.

Wardman's success at rowhouses allowed him to move up to building luxury apartment buildings, mostly designed by architect Albert H. Beers and Frank Russell White, and located along 16th Street, NW, Connecticut Avenue, Columbia Heights, and elsewhere. They include:

=== Hotels ===
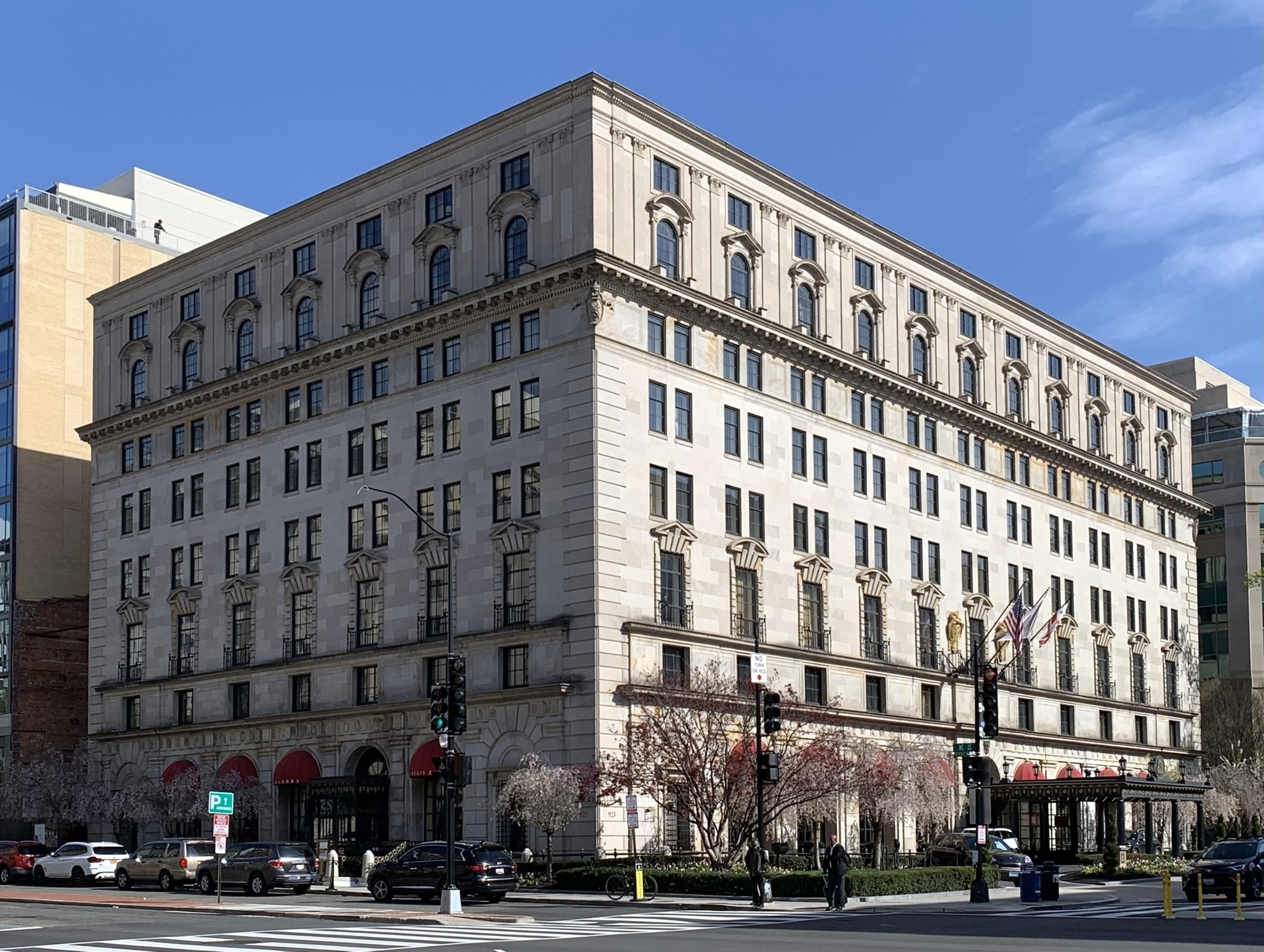
The St. Regis Washington, D.C., originally known as The Carlton Hotel, was built by Wardman in 1926.

In 1918, he opened the 1,200-room Wardman Park Hotel along Connecticut Avenue in Woodley Park. The hotel was successful, meeting the strong demand of an influx of government workers after World War I. It was expanded in 1928 with the Wardman Tower, an adjoining apartment building. The hotel was sold to Sheraton Hotels in 1953, becoming the Sheraton-Park Hotel. The main building was demolished in 1977 and replaced with a modern hotel, the Sheraton Washington Hotel. The Wardman Tower was saved and was added to the National Register of Historic Places in 1984. The 1977 Sheraton Washington Hotel has since been renamed the Marriott Wardman Park, in honor of Wardman's original building.

In 1926 he built The Carlton Hotel, designed by Armenian-American architect Mihran Mesrobian and today known as The St. Regis Washington, D.C.

In 1928, Wardman built the Hay-Adams Hotel, also designed by Mesrobian and located across from Lafayette Park. Other landmarks built by Wardman include the British Embassy.

Wardman's efforts made him wealthy, and for a time he lived extravagantly in Washington and abroad. But most of his $30 million fortune vanished in the 1929 stock market crash. He continued to build middle-class homes. Wardman died in 1938 from cancer and is buried in Rock Creek Cemetery.

=== Suburban developments ===
In 1927, he assumed the presidency of Washington Suburban Realty Company, developer of Cheverly, Maryland. He held that position until the stock market crash of 1929.

== Projects ==
Name	Date	Type	Address	Architect
Northbrook Court		Apartment	3420/3426 16th Street, NW	
The Chastleton		Apartment	1701 16th Street, NW	
Somerset House		Apartment	1801 16th Street, NW	
The Wardman		Apartment	1916 17th Street, NW	
The Melwood		Apartment	1803 Biltmore Street, NW	
The Brittany		Apartment	2001 16th Street, NW	
The Dresden		Apartment	2126 Connecticut Avenue, NW	
The Maxwell		Apartment	1419 Clifton Street, NW	
The Nelson		Apartment	1733 20th Street, NW	
Chatham Courts		Apartment	1707 Columbia Road, NW	
Northumberland Apartments		Apartment	2039 New Hampshire Avenue, NW	
Rutland Court		Apartment	1725 17th Street, NW	
South Cathedral Mansions		Apartment	2900 Connecticut Avenue, NW	
Wardman Court (formerly Clifton Terrace)		Apartment	1312 Clifton Street, NW	
Wardman Row	1911	Apartment	1416-1440 R Street, NW	
Copley Plaza		Apartment	1514 17th Street, NW	
Cavanaugh Court	1917	Apartment	1526 17th Street, NW	
2225 N Street Apartment Building		Apartment	2225 N Street, NW	
The Brighton		Apartment	2123 California Street, NW	
The Claiborne		Apartment	3033 16th Street, NW	
The St. Regis Washington, D.C. (built as The Carlton Hotel)	1926	Hotel	923 16th Street, NW	Mihran Mesrobian
Hay-Adams Hotel	1928	Hotel	800 16th Street, NW	Mihran Mesrobian
