= Dupont Circle Building =

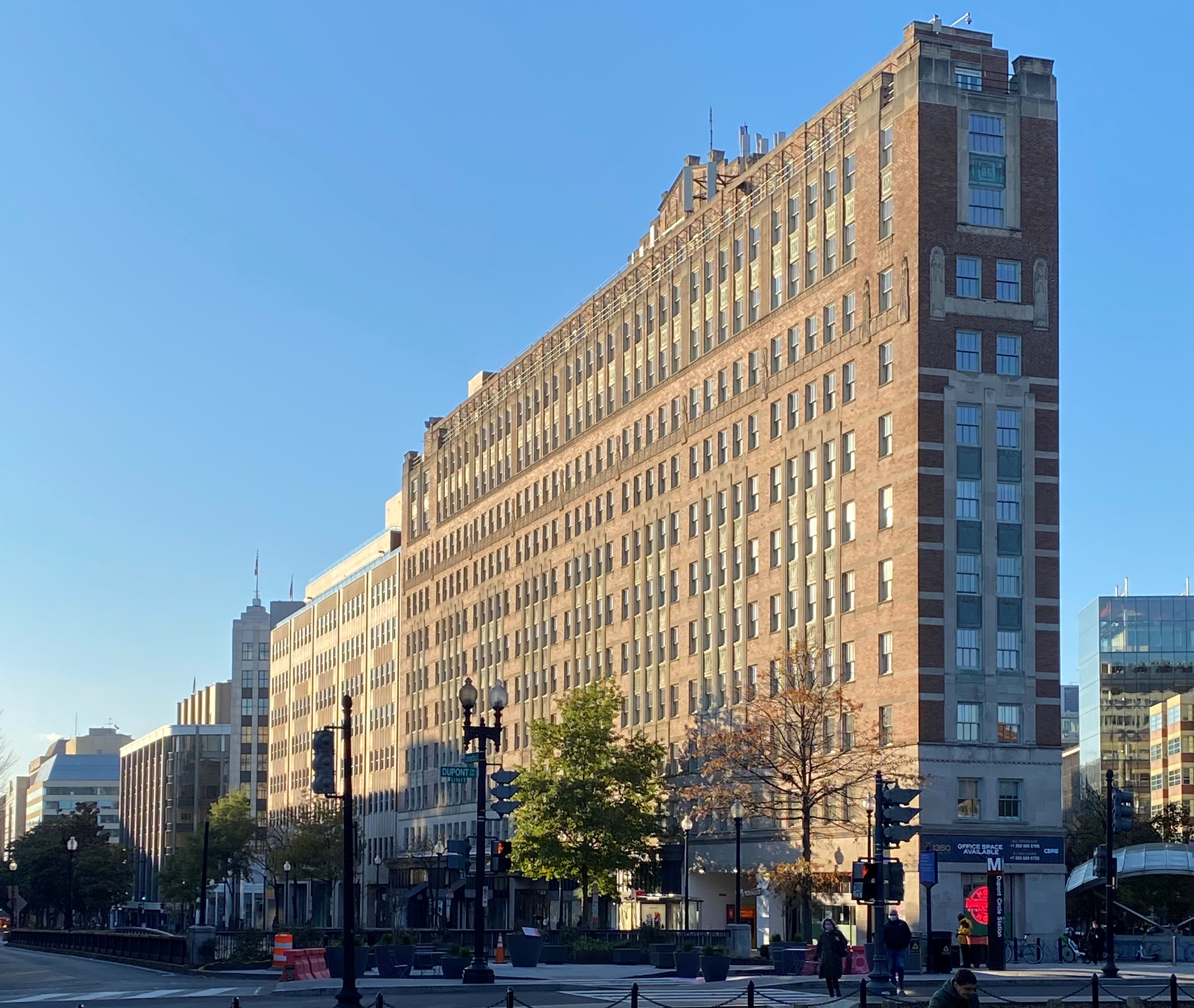
- Dupont Circle Building in 2022

General information
- Architectural style: Art Deco
- Location: Dupont Circle
- Address: 1350 Connecticut Avenue NW
- Town or city: Washington, D.C.
- Coordinates: 38°54′30″N 77°2′35″W
- Completed: 1931

Design and construction
- Architect(s): Mihran Mesrobian

The Dupont Circle Building is a landmark art deco building on the south end of Dupont Circle in Washington DC. The entrance is on 1350 Connecticut Avenue NW.

== Overview ==
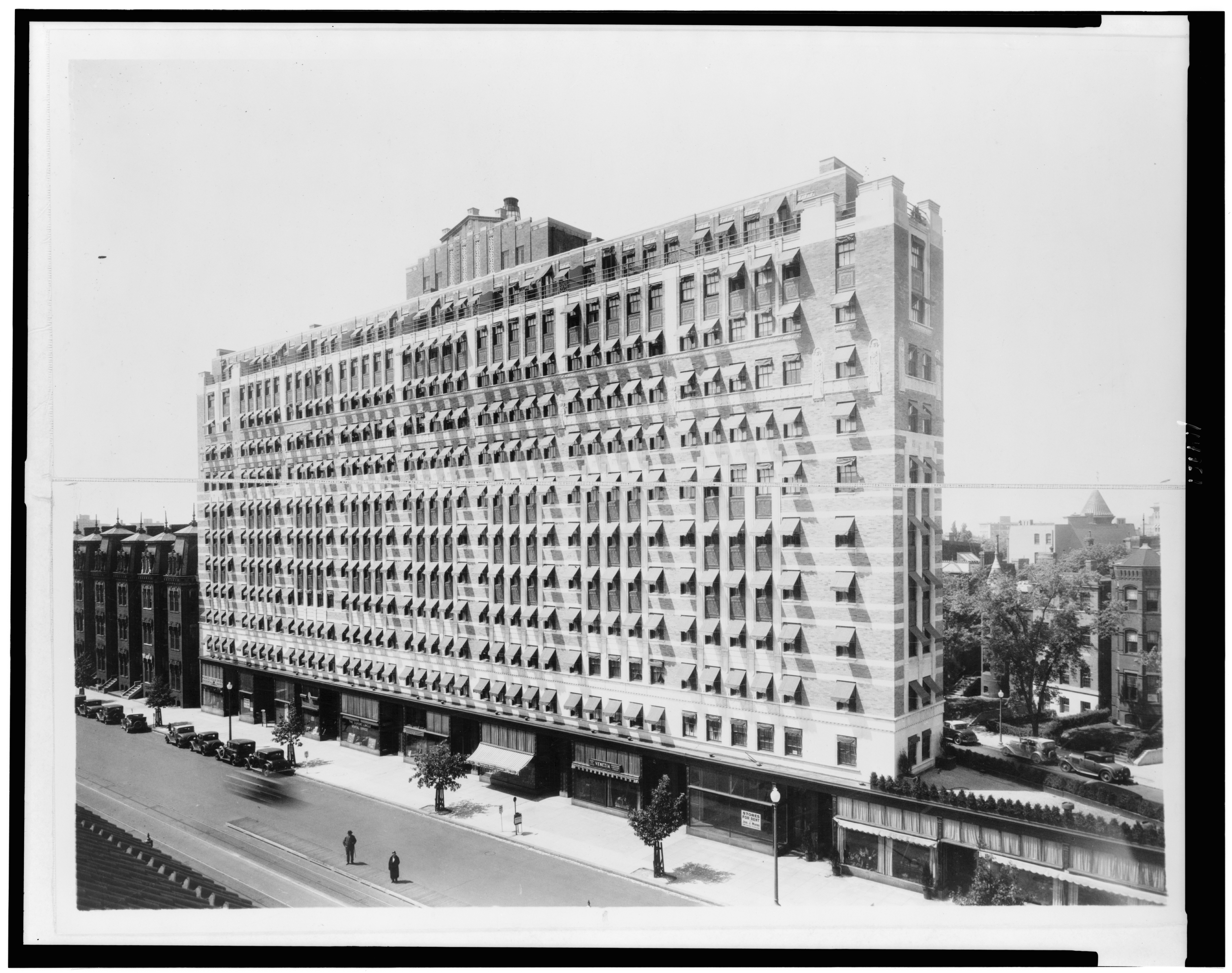
The building in the 1930s

The building was designed by architect Mihran Mesrobian, originally as an apartment building, and completed in 1931. In 1942 it was converted to offices. By October 1944, it had become the head office of the United Nations Relief and Rehabilitation Administration, which would remain there until its end in the late 1940s. At that time the main entrance was numbered 1344 Connecticut Avenue NW, which was later changed to 1350.

The American Institute of Architects's guide to the architecture of Washington DC assesses the Dupont Circle Building's bas-relief ornament as "genius" and judges that in respect of the interplay between ornament and geometry, "it outdoes New York's famous Flatiron Building."

By 2023, the tip of the building facing Dupont Circle was the location of a Krispy Kreme store, and one of the building's main tenants was the Gault Center.

== See also ==
- Hay–Adams Hotel
- The St. Regis Washington, D.C.
