= Mihran Mesrobian House =

Historic house in Maryland, United States

- U.S. National Register of Historic Places
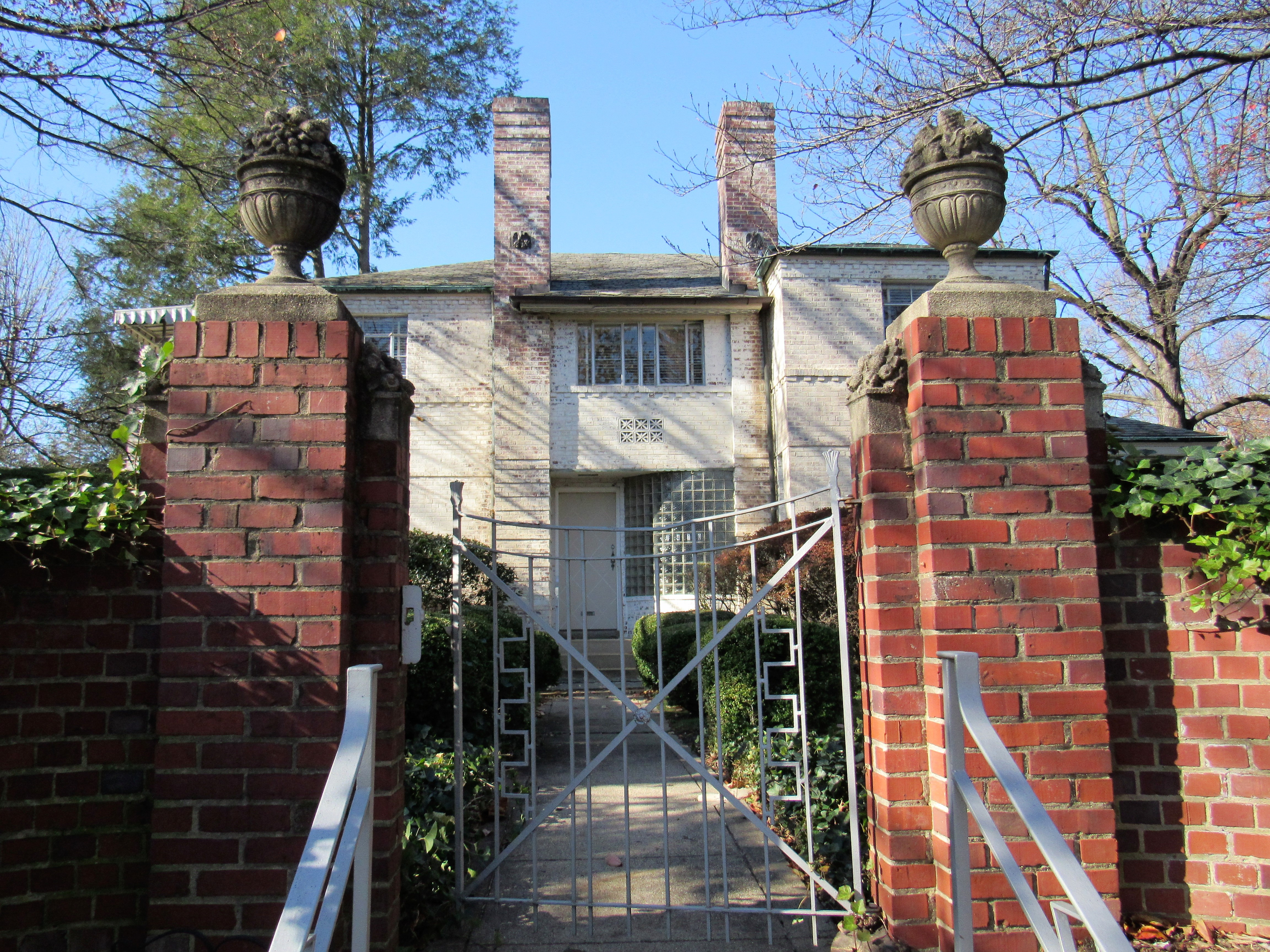
- The house, brick wall, and gates were all designed by Mesrobian.

- Location within Maryland Location within the United States
- Location: 7410 Connecticut Ave. Chevy Chase, Maryland
- Coordinates: 38°59′03.8″N 77°04′39.3″W
- Area: less than one acre
- Built: 1941, 1945
- Architectural style: Art Moderne
- NRHP reference No.: 100001794
- Added to NRHP: November 13, 2017

The Mihran Mesrobian House is a historic building in Chevy Chase, Montgomery County, Maryland, United States.

The house was designed by Washington, D.C.-area architect Mihran Mesrobian, the only residence that he designed for himself and his wife Zabelle. Mesrobian, better known for his Beaux-Arts designs in the 1920s and Art Deco designs in the 1930s, chose the Art Moderne style for his house, which was completed in 1941. It stands out among the more traditional revival styles in the neighborhood. Earlier designs for the house show "a much more radical, modernistic design," but he made concessions to the "Chevy Chase Land Company's more conservative design covenants."

The two-story frame-and-brick veneer structure has a full basement. It has asymmetrical massing, whitewashed brick that resembles concrete, glass block panels, a sun porch on the second floor, and a low hip roof. Mesrobian also designed the cinderblock-and-brick perimeter wall with classical cast-stone decorative elements, along with its gate, which were completed in 1945.

Mesrobian lived in the house until his death in 1975. It was listed on the National Register of Historic Places in 2017.
