= Calvert Manor =

Historic apartments in Virginia, US

- U.S. National Register of Historic Places
- Virginia Landmarks Register
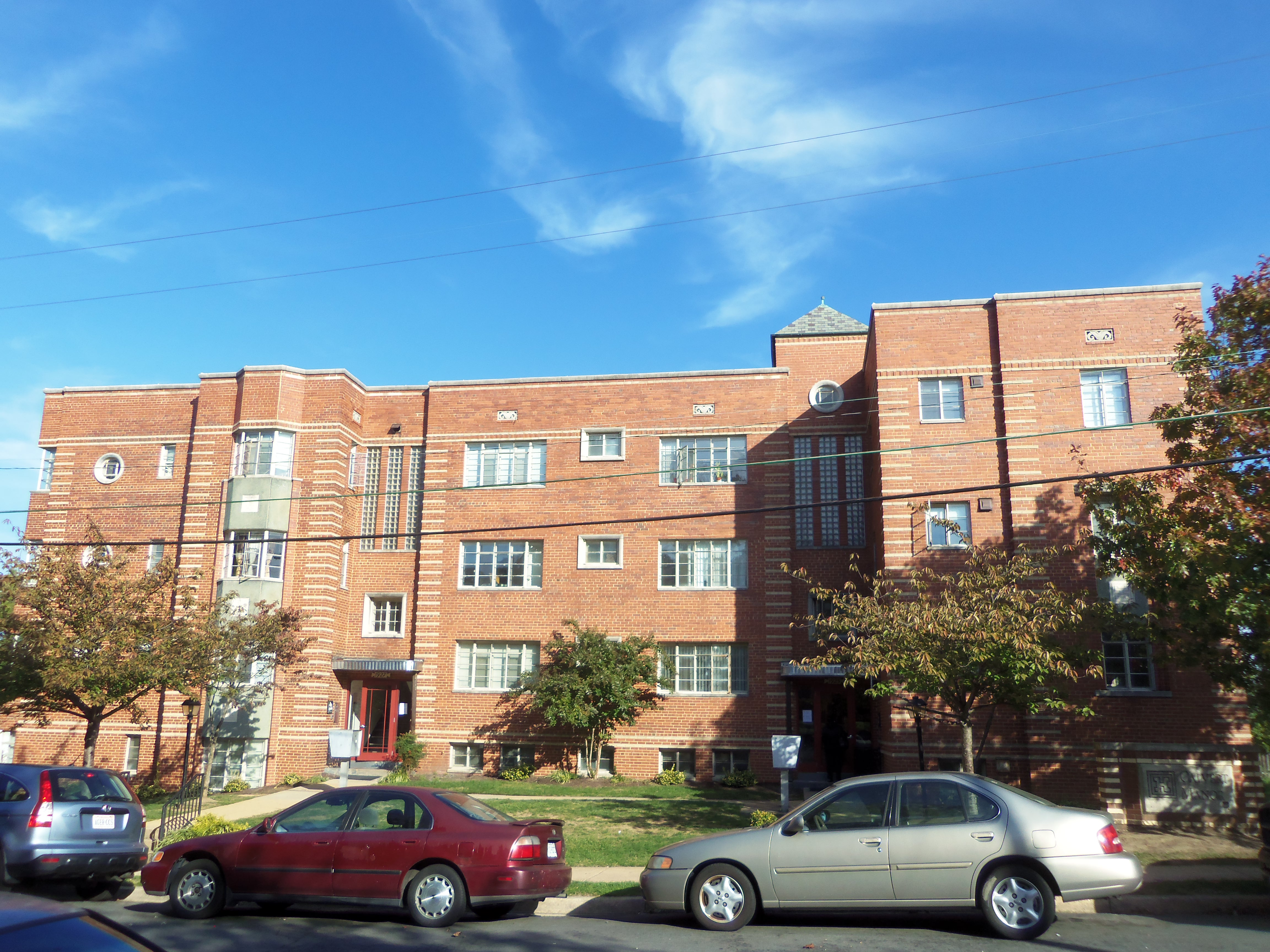

- Location within District of Columbia Location within Virginia Location within the United States
- Nearest city: 1925-1927 N. Calvert St., Arlington, Virginia
- Coordinates: 38°53′42″N 77°5′32″W
- Built: 1948
- Architect: Mihran Mesrobian
- Architectural style: Moderne
- NRHP reference No.: 97001506
- VLR No.: 000-2265

Significant dates
- Added to NRHP: December 15, 1997
- Designated VLR: September 17, 1997

Calvert Manor is a historic apartment building located at 1925-1927 North Calvert Street in Arlington, Virginia. It was designed by noted Washington, D.C. architect Mihran Mesrobian and built in 1948, in the Moderne style. Mesrobian was also the builder and owner of Calvert Manor. The three-story garden apartment building is constructed of concrete block with red brick facing, highlighted by light-colored cast stone, cement brick details, and vertical bands of glass block.

On December 15, 1997, it was added to the National Register of Historic Places.
