= Glebe Center =

Historic commercial building in Virginia, United States

- U.S. National Register of Historic Places
- Virginia Landmarks Register
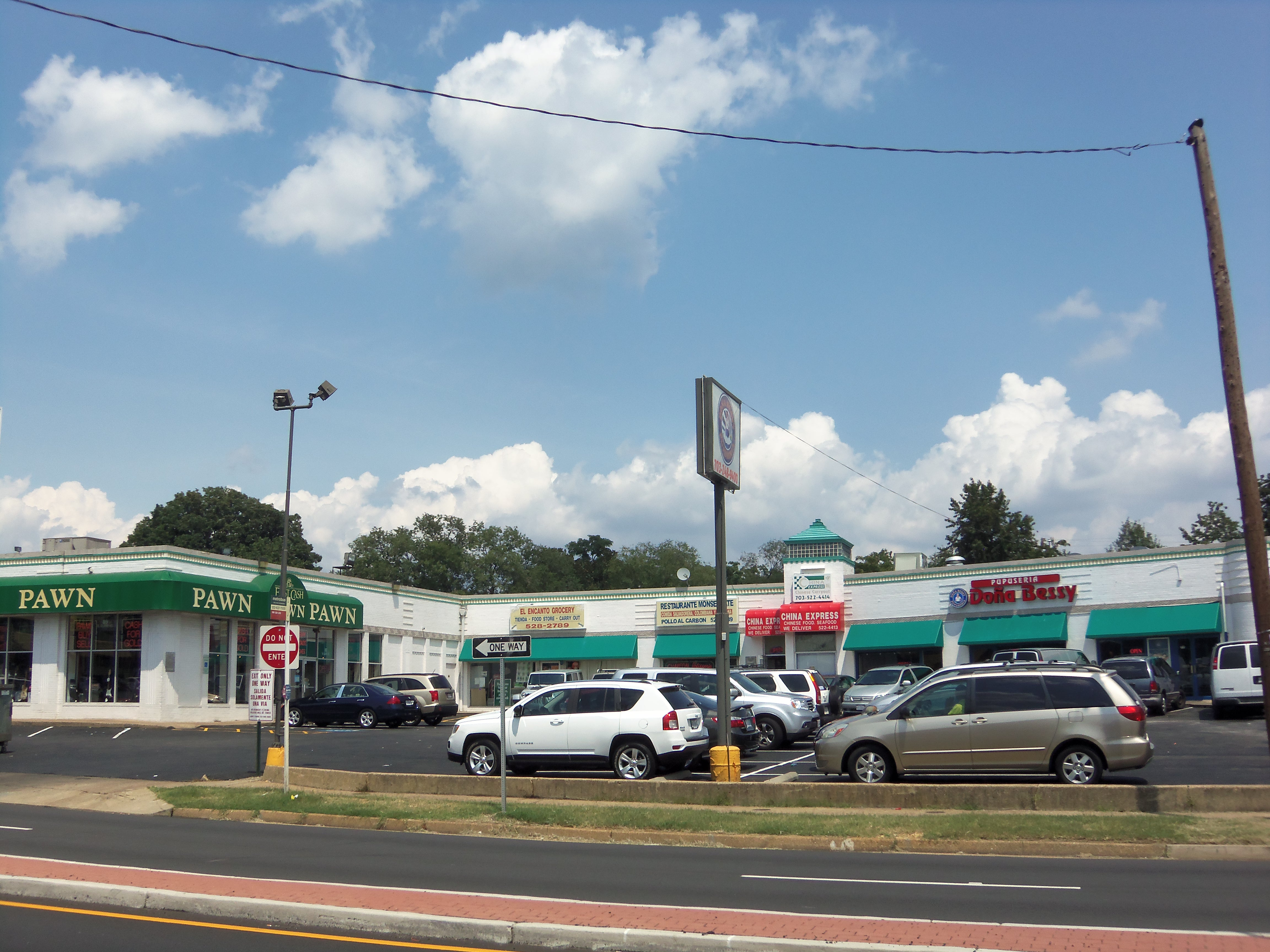

- Location within District of Columbia Location within Virginia Location within the United States
- Location: 71-89 N. Glebe Rd., Arlington County, Virginia, U.S.
- Coordinates: 38°52′18″N 77°6′8″W
- Area: 0 acres (0 ha)
- Built: 1940
- Built by: F&W Construction
- Architect: Mesrobian, Mihran
- Architectural style: Art Deco, Moderne
- NRHP reference No.: 04000055
- VLR No.: 000-9415

Significant dates
- Added to NRHP: February 11, 2004
- Designated VLR: December 3, 2003

Glebe Center, also known as Glebe Shopping Center, is a historic shopping center located in the Ballston neighborhood of Arlington County, Virginia. It was designed by Washington, D.C. architect Mihran Mesrobian, and built in 1940.

It is a one-story, L-shaped cinder-block building with a flat parapet roof and clad in a six-course, American-bond brick veneer with cast-stone decorative accents. It features large store-front windows, Art Deco decorative elements, and a central square tower surmounted by a glass-block clerestory capped by a pyramidal-shaped metal roof. It was built to serve the residents of the Buckingham apartment complex and Ashton Heights, as well as the many motorists traveling along Arlington Boulevard and North Glebe Road.

It was listed on the National Register of Historic Places in 2004.
