= Sedgwick Gardens =

Coordinates: 38.939°N 77.0609°W

- U.S. National Register of Historic Places
- U.S. Historic district – Contributing property
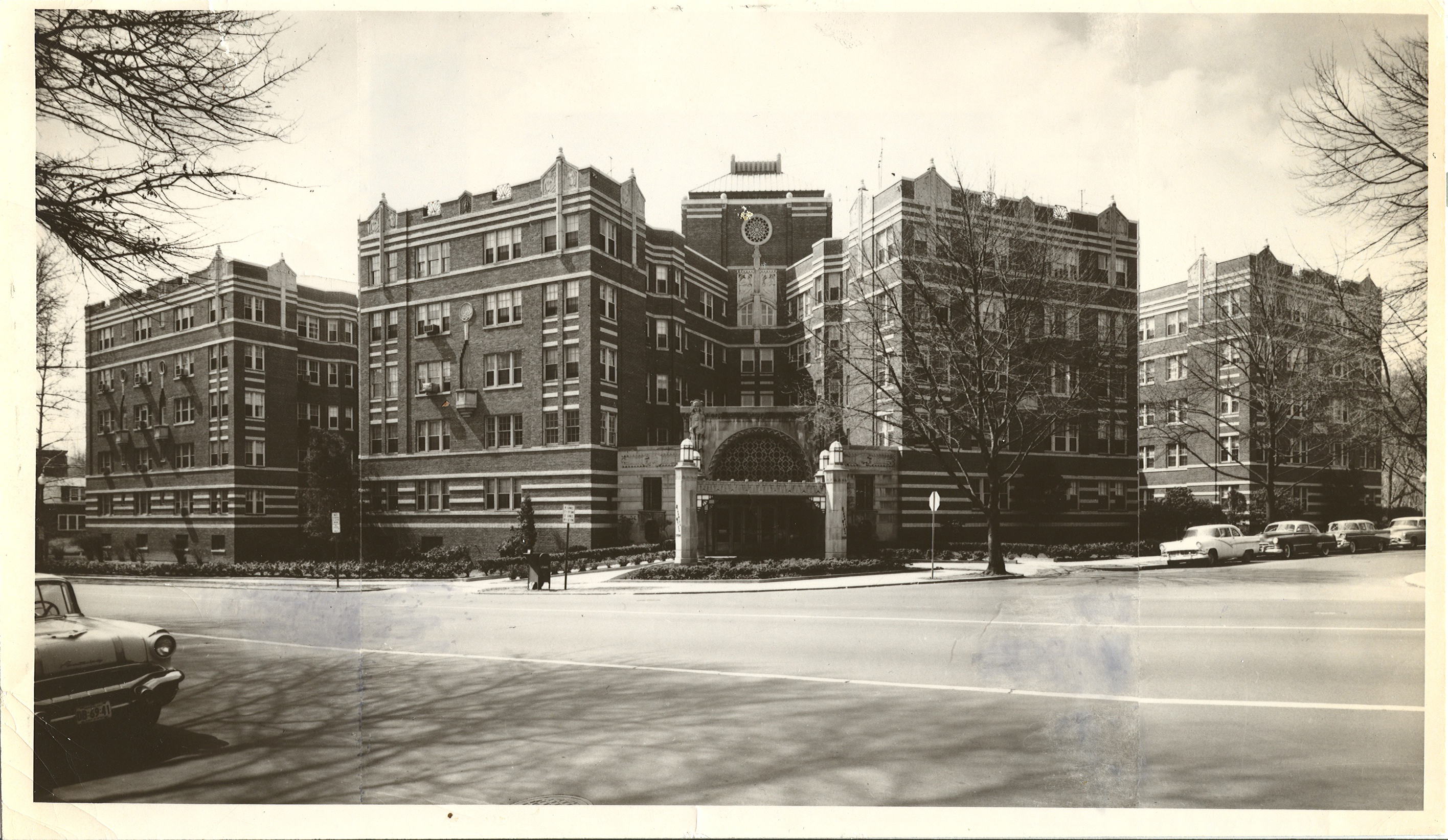
- Sedgwick Gardens
- Location: 3726 Connecticut Avenue, NW, Washington, DC
- Built: 1931
- Architect: Mihran Mesrobian
- Architectural style: Art Deco
- Part of: Cleveland Park Historic District (ID87000628)
- NRHP reference No.: 16000028

Significant dates
- Added to NRHP: February 23, 2016
- Designated CP: April 27, 1987

Sedgwick Gardens is an apartment building at 3726 Connecticut Avenue Northwest, on the southwest corner with Sedgwick Street, in Northwest Washington D.C. It is located two blocks from the Cleveland Park station of the Washington Metro. It is listed in the National Register of Historic Places, and represents a significant example of an Art Deco porte-cochere architecture in Washington.

== Overview ==
Sedgwick Gardens was designed by prominent Washington architect Mihran Mesrobian for local developer Max Gorin of the Southern Construction Company in 1931 for $500,000, and in 1932 opened as a rental apartments building. It is currently distinguished as one of the Cleveland Park Historic District apartment complexes in Washington.

Its entrance has been designed so that the eye of any visitor is drawn upward toward of a pair of high relief female figures, a pair of bas-relief male figures, and further toward the rose window on the massive square elevator tower in the background. White brick bands within the red brick facade line the main and top floors while shorter white bands lay just below each floors’ windows. Triangular projecting sculptured panels and niches that hold wrought iron deco railings interrupt a peculiar cornice treatment, and additional light and air for most of the apartments are provided by the encirclement of two dozen projecting bays. The building represents an exceptional double-U design.

== Building ==
The interiors of Sedgwick Gardens include solid mahogany doors, brass hardware, and limestone-marble in the octagonal lobby. Two dozen Moorish-style arches and columns, the six-sided skylight, and the restored octagonal fountain enhance the space. In the center rear of the lobby a small staircase leads to the first floor, just up half a story. In the style of the 1930s, dinettes replaced the large formal dining rooms in all 120 apartments. Originally each of these, including the one-bedrooms, contained a Murphy bed, but today only a few remain.

In the current day, renovations continue to be made by its owners, DARO Realty, Inc., and in particular, attention has been paid to upgrade kitchens while still striving to preserve the apartments’ original architectural elements. The restoration included restoration architects and artisans to ensure that the original character of the building has been retained. The exterior, lobby and hallways have all been restored.

Of particular note is the recent renovation of the lobby complete with marble and limestone floors, Moorish-style arches and columns, an octagonal water fountain, and an enormous hexagonal skylight that allows plenty of natural light.

== Grounds ==
The Victory Gardens, which date to World War II, abut the park to the apartment building's western property line. The War brought many changes. The basement storeroom was cleared to make room for an air raid shelter and tenants donated carpets, furniture, and canned goods to fix it up. After the War, a self-service elevator was installed and many changes have continued to occur over the years, but the buildings old charm survives. Most of the cabana doors are still intact and date back to the original 1930s design for the building. Although every apartment today has air conditioning units, there are louvered doors, which are screen-like, allowing ventilation to the halls and between apartments. Today, the site of the Victory Gardens has been reconstructed to accommodate the grounds parking lot.
