= Mihran Mesrobian =

Armenian-American architect

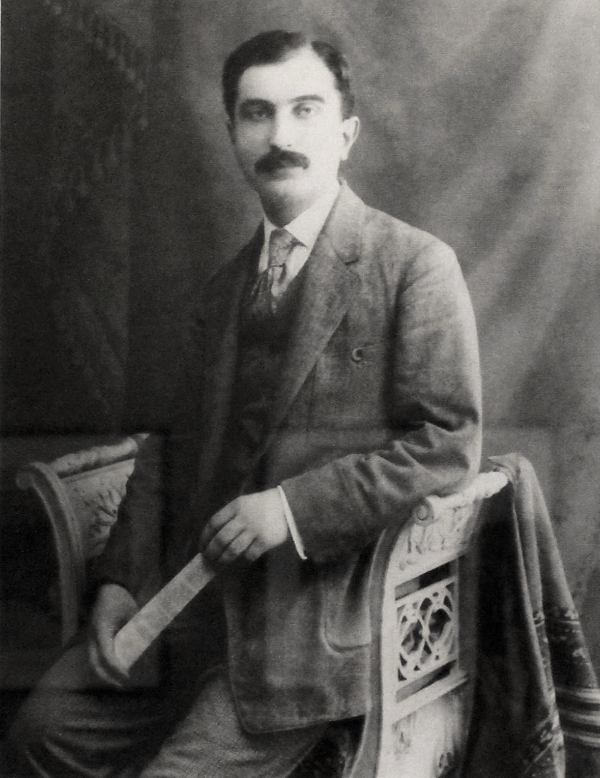
- Born: 10 May 1889; Afyonkarahisar, Ottoman Empire
- Died: 21 September 1975 (aged 86); Chevy Chase, Maryland, U.S.
- Resting place: Rock Creek Cemetery; Washington, D.C., U.S.
- Occupation: Architect
- Awards: Iron Cross (Germany); Ottoman War Medal (Ottoman Empire); Liakat Medal (Ottoman Empire); Iftikhar Sanayi Medal (Ottoman Empire)
- Buildings: The Carlton Hotel (now The St. Regis Washington, D.C.), 1926; Hay-Adams Hotel, 1927; Wardman Tower (now Marriott Wardman Park Hotel), 1928; Dupont Circle Building, 1931; Calvert Manor, 1948

Mihran Mesrobian (Armenian: Միհրան Մեսրոպեան; 10 May 1889 – 21 September 1975) was an Armenian-American architect whose career spanned over fifty years and in several countries. Having received an education in the Academy of Fine Arts in Istanbul, Mesrobian began his career as an architect in İzmir and in Istanbul. While in Constantinople, Mesrobian served as the palace architect to the last Ottoman Sultan, Mehmed V.

During World War I, Mesrobian was drafted into the Ottoman army and became a decorated soldier. He participated in the Gallipoli Campaign and served in the Eastern front against the Russians during the Caucasus Campaign and the Arabs during the Arab Revolt. During this time, the Armenian genocide began, and his family in his native Afyonkarahisar were deported and never to be heard of again. Mesrobian lost fifteen members of his family as a result of the genocide. He was held captive under the Arabs but was ultimately freed with the help of T. E. Lawrence (Lawrence of Arabia).

Mesrobian immigrated to the United States in 1921 and became a prominent architect in the Washington, D.C. area. He became the primary in-house architect for Washington developer Harry Wardman. Much of his architecture reflected an Art Deco style, however a few of his projects were done in the Italian Renaissance and Moderne styles as well. Among his most noted works are the Hay–Adams Hotel, the Dupont Circle Building, The Carlton Hotel, Sedgwick Gardens, Calvert Manor, and Glebe Center.

== Early life ==
Mihran Mesrobian was born 10 May 1889 in Afyonkarahisar, Ottoman Empire to Gaspar and Miriam (née Palanjian), an Armenian family of merchants. Mihran's immediate family consisted of three brothers and one sister. The Mesrobian family had lived in Afyonkarahisar for generations and were involved in the opium and cereal trade.

Mihran Mesrobian attended the local Sahakian Armenian school which provided education aligned with European standards. At a young age, Mesrobian was already proficient in drawing and sketching. While a student at Sahakian, he further developed his talents by receiving education in penmanship, math, drawing, and manual labor/construction. Sahakian also taught various languages including French, Ottoman Turkish, Armenian, and English, all of which helped Mesrobian in his education and future career.

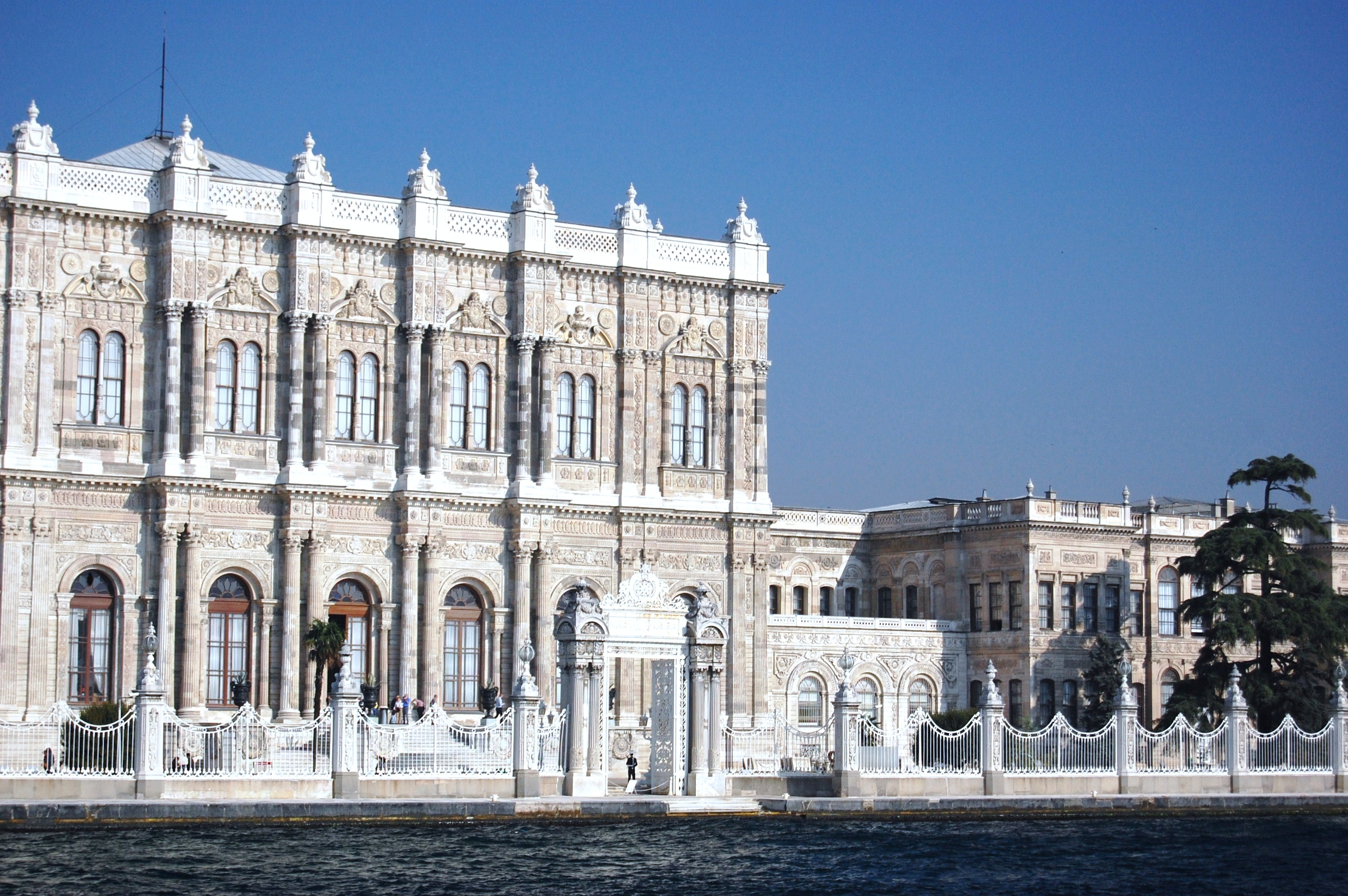
Designed by Armenian architect Garabet Balyan, a member of the renowned Balyan family of Ottoman imperial architects, the Dolmabahçe Palace served as the administrative center of the Ottoman Empire. As chief architect of the Ottoman sultan, Mesrobian conducted an extensive restoration of the palace.

At the age of fifteen, Mihran Mesrobian's talent in drawing and sketching was noticed by his father who then sent him to Constantinople to take entrance exams at the Academy of Fine Arts. Already a skilled drawer, Mesrobian did exceptionally well in the exams and was then placed in second-year of courses, instead of the beginning first-year. As a result, he finished the academy in four years rather than the conventional five. After his graduation in 1908, Mesrobian started a construction firm with a classmate. However, the firm turned out to be unsuccessful and Mesrobian subsequently moved to Smyrna (present-day İzmir).

== Career in the Ottoman Empire ==
After Mesrobian moved to Smyrna, he was appointed as municipal architect of the city in 1909. He designed numerous buildings including one hotel, eight houses, one warehouse, one market containing sixty-four stores, one bank, and a club house. Mesrobian also formulated a 1100-acre topographical map of Smyrna that charted 1615 lots of the city. He designed the layouts of several farmhouses and built canals to help expand irrigation in and around the city.

However, it is believed that many of the buildings designed by Mesrobian were destroyed due to the Great Fire of Smyrna of 1922, with the exception of the hotel built in 1912. The whereabouts of this hotel are unknown, though it is believed to be located in the old town of the city. He remained in Smyrna until 1912, when he returned to Constantinople.

In Constantinople, Mesrobian was appointed as chief architect to the palace of the Ottoman Sultan, Mehmed V. Throughout his career as a chief architect to the Sultan, he was tasked to draft the restorations of some thirty Ottoman Palaces, including the famous Dolmabahçe Palace. The Dolmabahçe Palace had been neglected for thirty years and was in a state of disrepair during the reign of Sultan Abdulhamid II, who preferred to live in the Yildiz Palace instead. When the Dolmabahçe Palace was restored as an administrative center for the Sultan, a massive restoration of the building was needed. Mesrobian was subsequently employed as the chief architect of the restoration. Meanwhile, he took charge of restorations of many buildings in the Beyoğlu district of the city. At this point of his career, Mesrobian became a well-known figure for his work.

A self-portrait drawing of Mihran Mesrobian while serving the Ottoman army

Mesrobian took a break from his duties as an architect and returned to Smyrna to marry Zabelle Martmanian, an Armenian woman he had met while living in Smyrna. The daughter of Hyrabed and Nectar (née Topalian), Zabelle's family was also from Mihran's birthplace of Afyonkarahisar. They married on 23 May 1914 and eventually had three sons: Nourhan, Ralfe and Ara.

When Mesrobian was drafted into the Ottoman army during World War I, his career as an architect was interrupted.

After the war, he returned to Constantinople in June 1919 and was immediately employed as the architect of the city administration of Istanbul. He resumed his work on the Dolmabahce Palace, which was left incomplete due to the war. He also continued designing apartment buildings in the city just before emigrating from the Ottoman Empire in 1921.

== World War I ==
At the start of World War I, Mihran Mesrobian was conscripted into the Ottoman Army in August 1914. Shortly after, he attended the Beylerbeyi Reserve Officers School upon which he graduated from as a 2nd lieutenant in October 1914. Mesrobian was thus attached to the 4th Fortifications Regiment and served as an engineer. He was first sent to the Dardanelles where he took part in the Gallipoli Campaign in April 1915. Mesrobian was directly under the command of Mustafa Kemal Atatürk, the future first President of the Republic of Turkey. He was tasked to position mines and develop tunnels beneath enemy positions. He was also responsible for creating topographical maps, developing roads, and designing fortifications. Having proved successful on the battlefield, Mesrobian was awarded numerous medals including the German Iron Cross and several Turkish medals.

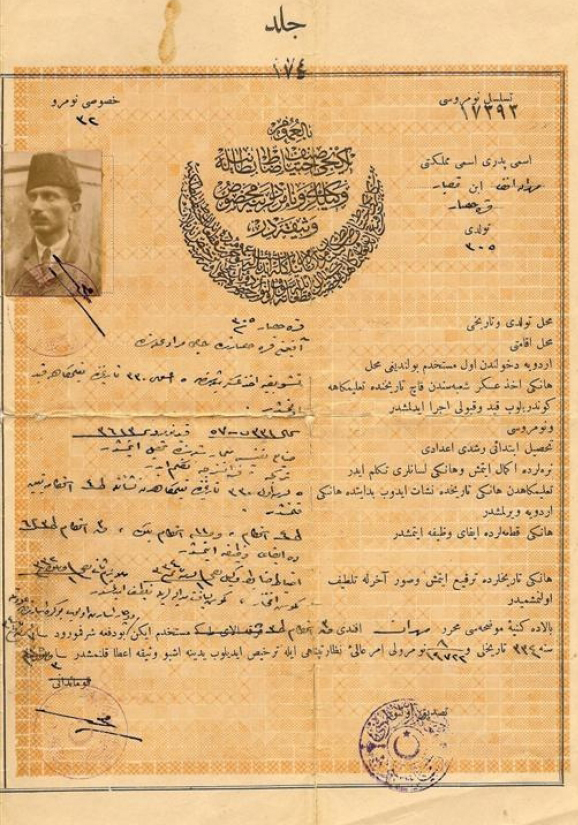
Military record of Mihran Mesrobian for the Ottoman army

Mesrobian was then transferred to the Russian front during the winter. The journey to the front was delayed by heavy snow. Thereafter, Mesrobian's battalion was transferred to the Palestinian and Syrian front to combat Arab forces. In the fall of 1918, during an offensive spearheaded by British forces who were assisted by the Arabs, most members of the 4th Army Corps to which Mesrobian was attached were captured by the Arabs. But Mesrobian managed to flee and was left wandering for several days. While in Palestine, he was ultimately captured by the Arabs and Mesrobian and his unit were then sentenced to death by their Arab hostage-takers. However, T. E. Lawrence, who is better known as Lawrence of Arabia, happened to be in the area and was able to intervene and save their lives. Mesrobian was then transferred to a British encampment in Zagazig, Egypt and was held there as a prisoner of war (POW) from late fall 1918 until his release in May 1919.

== Armenian genocide ==
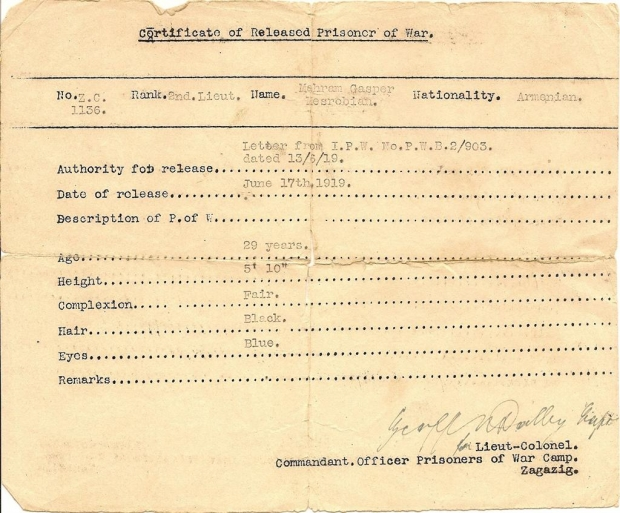
Mesrobian's POW release certificate from the Zigazig encampment site in Egypt in 1919.

In April 1915, while Mesrobian was stationed in Gallipoli, the Ottoman government began the systematic extermination of its minority Armenian subjects known as the Armenian genocide. The genocide carried out during and after World War I was implemented in two phases: the wholesale killing of the able-bodied male population through massacre and subjection of army conscripts to forced labour, followed by the deportation of women, children, the elderly and infirm on death marches leading to the Syrian Desert. Driven forward by military escorts, the deportees were deprived of food and water and subjected to periodic robbery, rape, and massacre. The deportations in his native town of Afyonkarahisar, where Mesrobian's family still resided, began on 15 August 1915. Mihran Mesrobian returned to Constantinople after the war and discovered that fifteen members of his family and relatives in Afyonkasarhisar were deported. All were never to be heard of again, though it is believed that they were deported to Iraq. Among those whose whereabouts remain unknown were his three brothers, their families, and his younger sister. In a desperate attempt to save his property, Mesrobian returned to Afyonkarahisar to reclaim and ultimately sell it, but was unsuccessful since the property had been confiscated.

== Career in the United States ==
Due to growing maltreatment of the Armenians in the Ottoman Empire, Mesrobian decided to move to the United States in the early 1920s. With the allowance of Armenians immigrants into the United States reaching its limit, Mesrobian was given special permission to enter the country by the Secretary of Labor due to his expertise in architecture. Mesrobian settled in Washington D.C., where he worked as a draftsman under Washington developer Harry Wardman. During that time, and throughout the 1920s and into the 1930s, Wardman held the largest real estate development firm in Washington D.C.

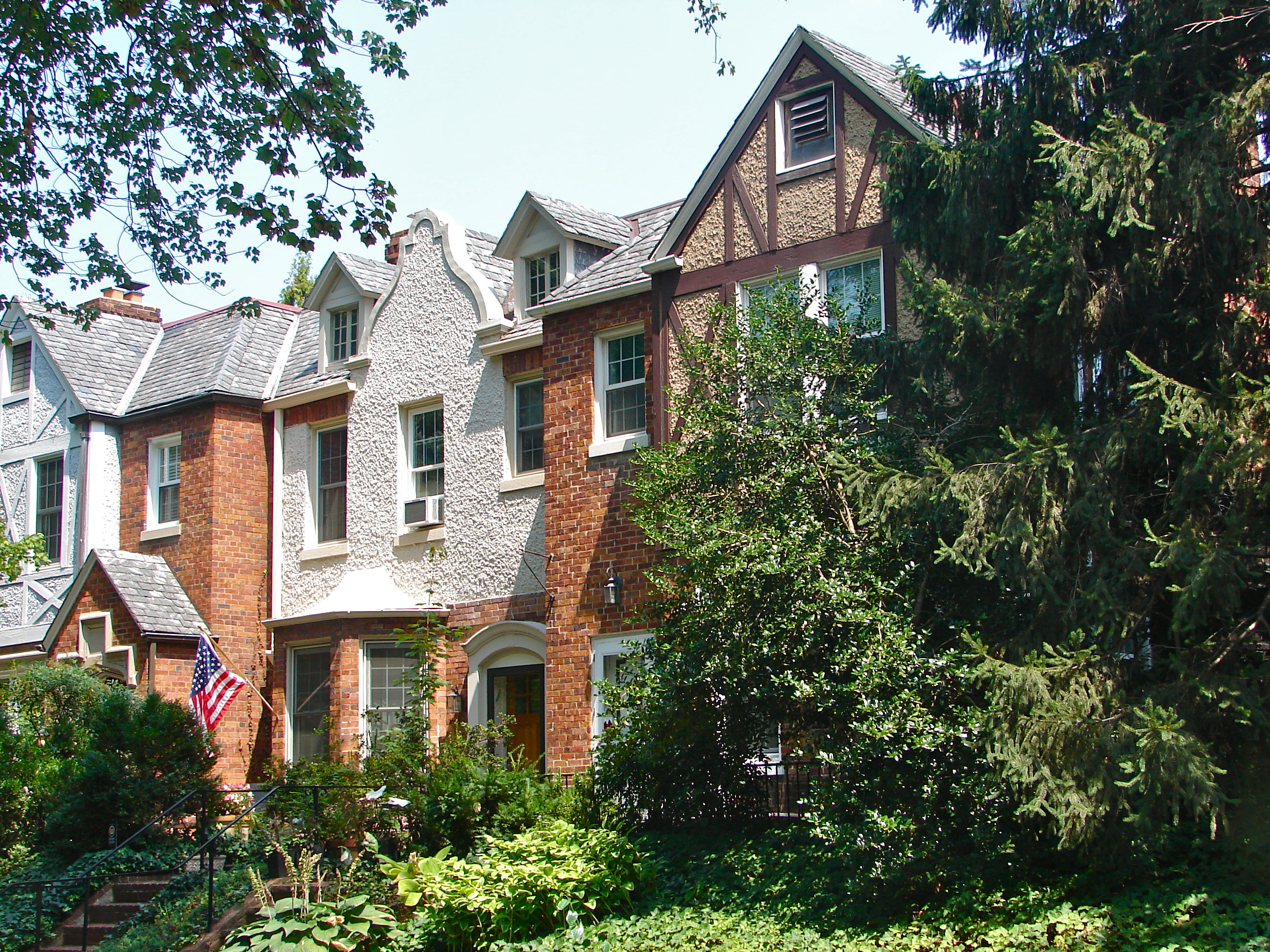
Mesrobian was involved in the housing development projects in the Woodley Park neighborhood of Washington, D.C. The houses in this photograph are located near the corner of 28th and Cathedral Streets.

Among Wardman's famous projects was the English Village in 1923, which became Mesrobian's first building he designed in the United States. Considered one of Wardman's largest housing development projects, the houses were located in Woodley Park and consisted of homes designed in the English Tudor style. The project also included another housing development near Woodley Park called the Cathedral Mansions off Connecticut Avenue. In 1924, he became the primary in-house architect for Harry Wardman, assuming Eugene Waggaman's position.

In 1925, a year after becoming the primary in-house architect for Wardman, Mesrobian was tasked to design the Carlton Hotel. The hotel was designed in a Beaux-Arts and Palazzo architectural style and was completed in 1926. The design of the building closely resembles the Palazzo Farnese with a structure consisting of strong and stylized quoins and a structural base that's rusticated. Wardman was forced to sell the hotel in 1930 upon declaring bankruptcy due to the Great Depression. The hotel was eventually resold in 1953 to Sheraton Hotels, which renamed the hotel the Sheraton-Carlton Hotel. The hotel is listed on the National Register of Historic Places, and is designated as a contributing property to the Sixteenth Street Historic District. In 1929, Mesrobian received an award for excellence in his design for his work with the Carlton Hotel by the Greater Washington Board of Trade. He also received the AIA's award for excellence in 1926.

Immediately after the success of the Carlton Hotel, Harry Wardman planned another hotel near the site where the 1885 homes of John Hay and Henry Adams once stood at 16th and H Streets NW. Wardman bought the property and razed the homes in 1927. The hotel was named the Hay–Adams Hotel and its design was exclusively granted to Mesrobian. At the time of its construction, the Hay-Adams hotel cost $900,000 and consisted of 138 rooms and was completed in 1928. The building was done in an Italian Renaissance style and it featured Ionic, Doric, and Corinthian columns of the classical Greek era. The hotel became a contributing property to the Lafayette Square Historic District and a member of the Historic Hotels of America.

A photograph taken in 1925 of Wardman and Mesrobian seated together. By this time, Mesrobian was the primary in-house architect for Wardman.

Mesrobian was then tasked to design the renovations of the Wardman Tower (now Marriott Wardman Park Hotel). Built between 1917 and 1918 by Wardman, the Wardman Park Hotel was an eight-story, red brick structure modeled on The Homestead resort in Virginia. The hotel was the largest in the city, with 1200 rooms and 625 baths. It was nicknamed Wardman's Folly, due to its location far outside the developed area of Washington. In 1928, the hotel was expanded with an eight-story, 350-room residential-hotel annex, designed by Mesrobian. Today, that building is the only surviving portion of the original Wardman Park, known as the Wardman Tower and is listed in the National Register of Historic Places. Wardman was forced to sell the hotel in 1931, due to the Great Depression, to Washington Properties. The Wardman towers are considered by The Washington Post to be "the most fashionable apartment address in Washington."

Mesrobian became an American citizen when he was naturalized in 1927. A few years later, after Wardman declared bankruptcy in 1930, Mesrobian established his own practice which produced a variety of residential and commercial work over the ensuing quarter century. Nevertheless, Mesrobian continued designing for Wardman until his death in 1938. During this time, the Dupont Circle Building was designed by Mesrobian in 1931. The building is located on the south end of Dupont Circle in Washington DC and its entrance is on 1350 Connecticut Avenue NW. It was designed in the art deco style and was originally built as an apartment building. In 1942 it was converted to an office building. The American Institute of Architects's guide to the architecture of Washington DC assesses the Dupont Circle Building's bas-relief ornament as "genius" and judges that in respect of the interplay between ornament and geometry, "it outdoes New York's famous Flatiron Building."

Early concept sketches of the Sedgwick Gardens

The Dupont Building was followed by the Sedgwick Gardens which was constructed by Max Gorin of the Southern Construction Company in 1931 for $500,000, and in 1932 opened as rental apartments buildings. The architectural style incorporated into the work is largely art-deco infused with a mix of Byzantine, Moorish, and medieval influences. The interiors of Sedgwick Gardens include solid mahogany doors, brass hardware, and limestone-marble in the octagonal lobby. Two dozen Moorish-style arches and columns, the six-sided skylight, and the restored octagonal fountain enhance the space. In the center rear of the lobby a small staircase leads to the first floor, just up half a story. In the style of the 1930s, dinettes replaced the large formal dining rooms in all 120 apartments. Its entrance has been designed so that the eye of any visitor is drawn upward toward of a pair of high relief female figures, a pair of bas-relief male figures, and further toward the rose window on the massive square elevator tower in the background. White brick bands within the red brick facade line the main and top floors while shorter white bands lay just below each floors' windows. Triangular projecting sculptured panels and niches that hold wrought iron deco railings interrupt a peculiar cornice treatment, and additional light and air for most of the apartments are provided by the encirclement of two dozen projecting bays. The building represents an exceptional double-U design in order to center the entrance so that it intersects between two streets. It is currently distinguished as one of the Historical District apartment complexes in Washington.

In 1931, while working on the Dupont Circle Building, Mesrobian was commissioned by an Armenian friend, Nejib Hekimian, to design his oriental carpet store. The store, located on 1214 18th Street, NW, was given a Middle-Eastern influence that incorporated arabesque and geometric motifs and polychrome tiles.

With the end of World War II, Mesrobian designed numerous apartments in Northern Virginia to accommodate the population boom. In 1940, Mesrobian designed the Glebe Center, also known as Glebe Shopping Center located in the Ballston neighborhood of Arlington County, Virginia. It is a one-story, L-shaped cinder-block building with a flat parapet roof and clad in a six-course, American-bond brick veneer with cast-stone decorative accents. It features large store-front windows, Art Deco decorative elements, and a central square tower surmounted by a glass-block clerestory capped by a pyramidal-shaped metal roof. It was built to serve the residents of the Buckingham apartment complex and Ashton Heights, as well as the many motorists traveling along Arlington Boulevard and North Glebe Road. It was listed on the National Register of Historic Places in 2004.

In 1943, Mesrobian designed the Wakefield Manor, a garden apartment complex located at 1215 N. Courthouse Road in Arlington. The design of the building incorporates an art-deco and moderne style and was built under standards promoted by the Federal Housing Administration (FHA).

In 1948, Mesrobian designed the Calvert Manor, a twenty-two unit apartment building located at 1925-1927 North Calvert Street in Arlington, Virginia. It was designed in the Moderne style and the building itself was laid out in a symmetrical design. Though Mesrobian was the architect behind the apartment, he held its ownership. After his death in 1975, the entitlement to the property was passed on to his children. The three-story garden apartment building is constructed of concrete block with red brick facing, highlighted by light-colored cast stone, cement brick details, and vertical bands of glass block. It was added to the National Register of Historic Places on 15 December 1997. The Calvert Manor also was awarded the Arlington County Preservation Design Award in 2002.

Just prior to his retirement, Mesrobian designed the Lee Gardens North Historic District, also known as Woodbury Park Apartments, in Arlington County, Virginia. The Lee Gardens North complex, completed in 1949–1950, is a garden apartment complex that contains thirty attached masonry structures forming seven contributing buildings in a residential neighborhood in South Arlington. The brick buildings are in the Colonial Revival style, with some fenestration elements influenced by the Art Deco and Moderne style. It was listed on the National Register of Historic Places in 2004.

Mihran Mesrobian retired in the early 1950s and lived in 7410 Connecticut Avenue in Chevy Chase, Maryland in a house he designed himself in 1941. The house is a two-story building made of brick and includes a pavilion that transforms into a porch. The front facade is asymmetrical with a wall of glass on the right and the front door on the left. Mesrobian lived in the house until his death in 1975. It was then listed on the National Register of Historic Places in 2017.

== Later life and death ==
In 1956, Mesrobian stepped out of retirement and volunteered to design the restoration of the St. Mary Armenian Apostolic Church in Washington D.C. The restoration included a new design for the sanctuary of the church.

Mihran Mesrobian died on 21 September 1975 at the age of eighty-six in Chevy Chase, Maryland and is buried at the Rock Creek Cemetery in Washington D.C.

== Awards and decorations ==
A photograph of the military medals belonging to Mihran Mesrobian

- Iron Cross (Germany)
- Gallipoli Star (Ottoman Empire)
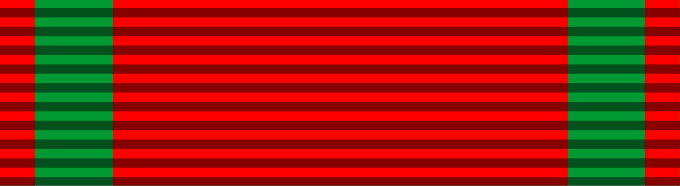
- Liakat Medal (Ottoman Empire)
- Iftikhar Sanayi Medal (Ottoman Empire)

== Selected works ==
- The Carlton Hotel (now The St. Regis Washington, D.C.), 1926
- Hay–Adams Hotel, Washington, D.C., 1927
- Wardman Tower (now a wing of the Marriott Wardman Park Hotel), 1928
- Dupont Circle Building, Washington, D.C., 1931
- Sedgwick Gardens, Washington, D.C., 1931
- Glebe Center, Arlington, Virginia, 1940
- Wakefield Manor, Arlington, Virginia, 1943
- Calvert Manor, Arlington, Virginia, 1948
- Lee Gardens North, Arlington, Virginia, 1949–1950

== Gallery ==
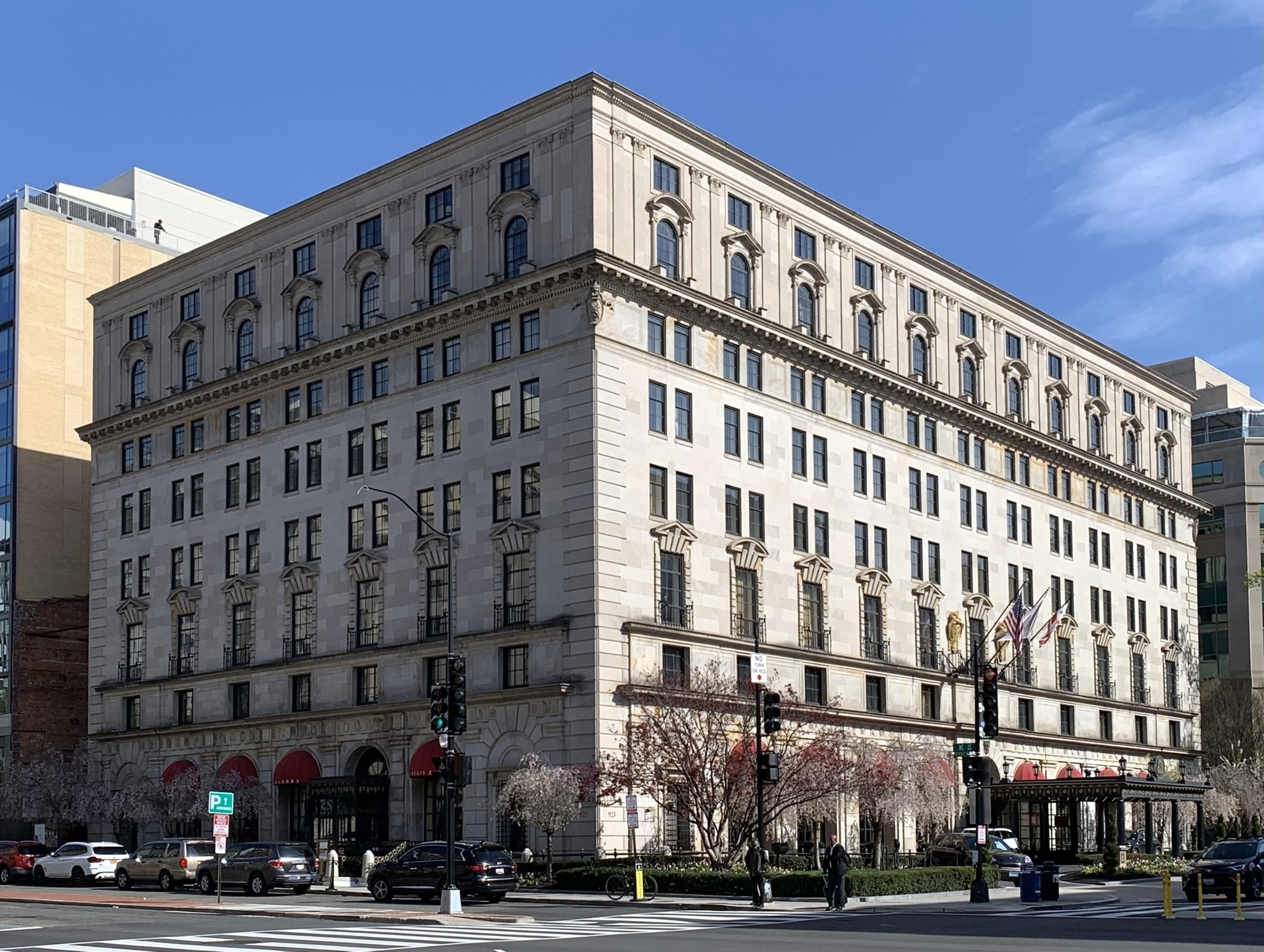
The Carlton Hotel, now known as The St. Regis, was designed by Mesrobian in 1926.

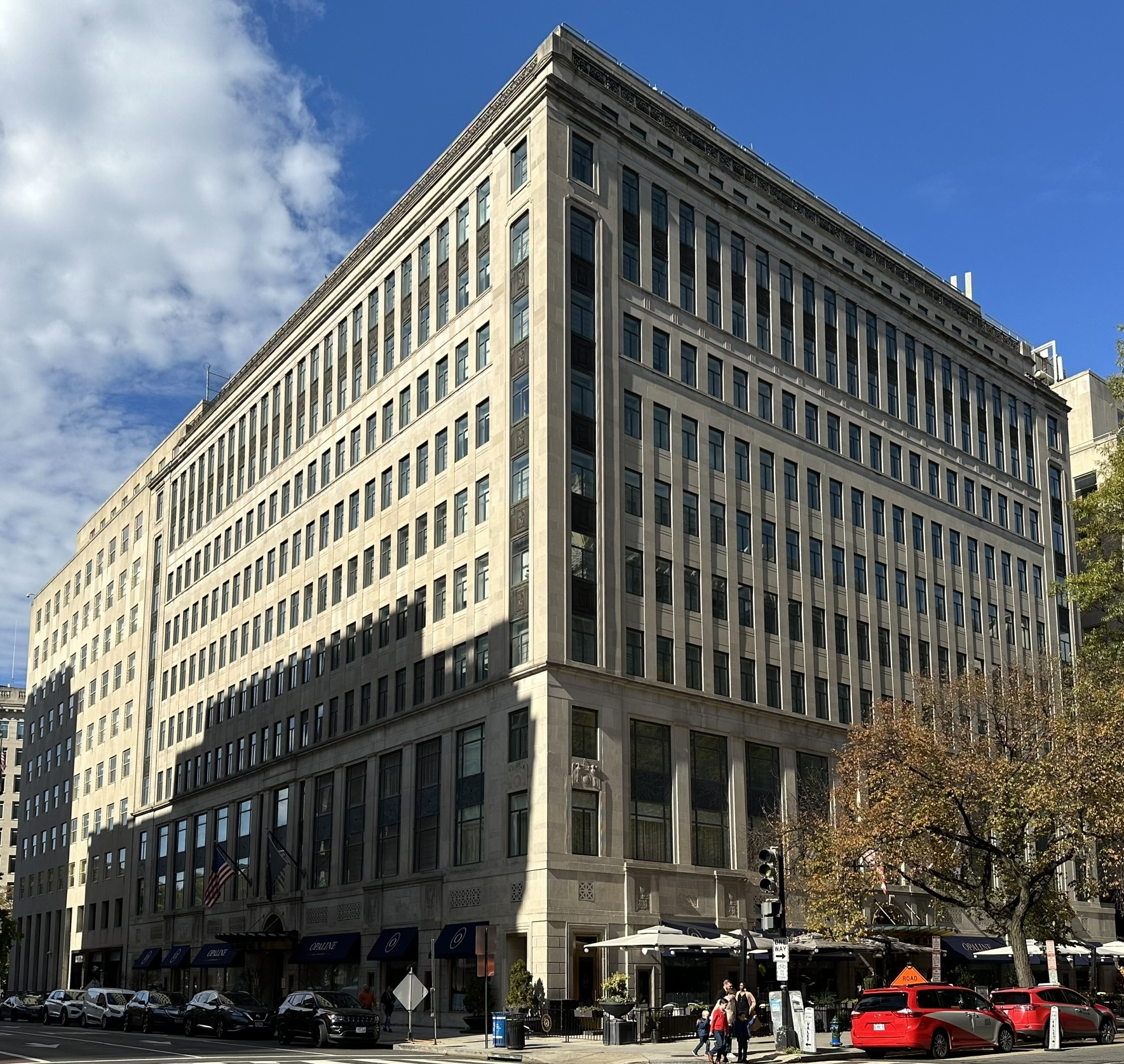
The Shoreham, completed in 1929, is now the Sofitel Washington, D.C. Lafayette Square.

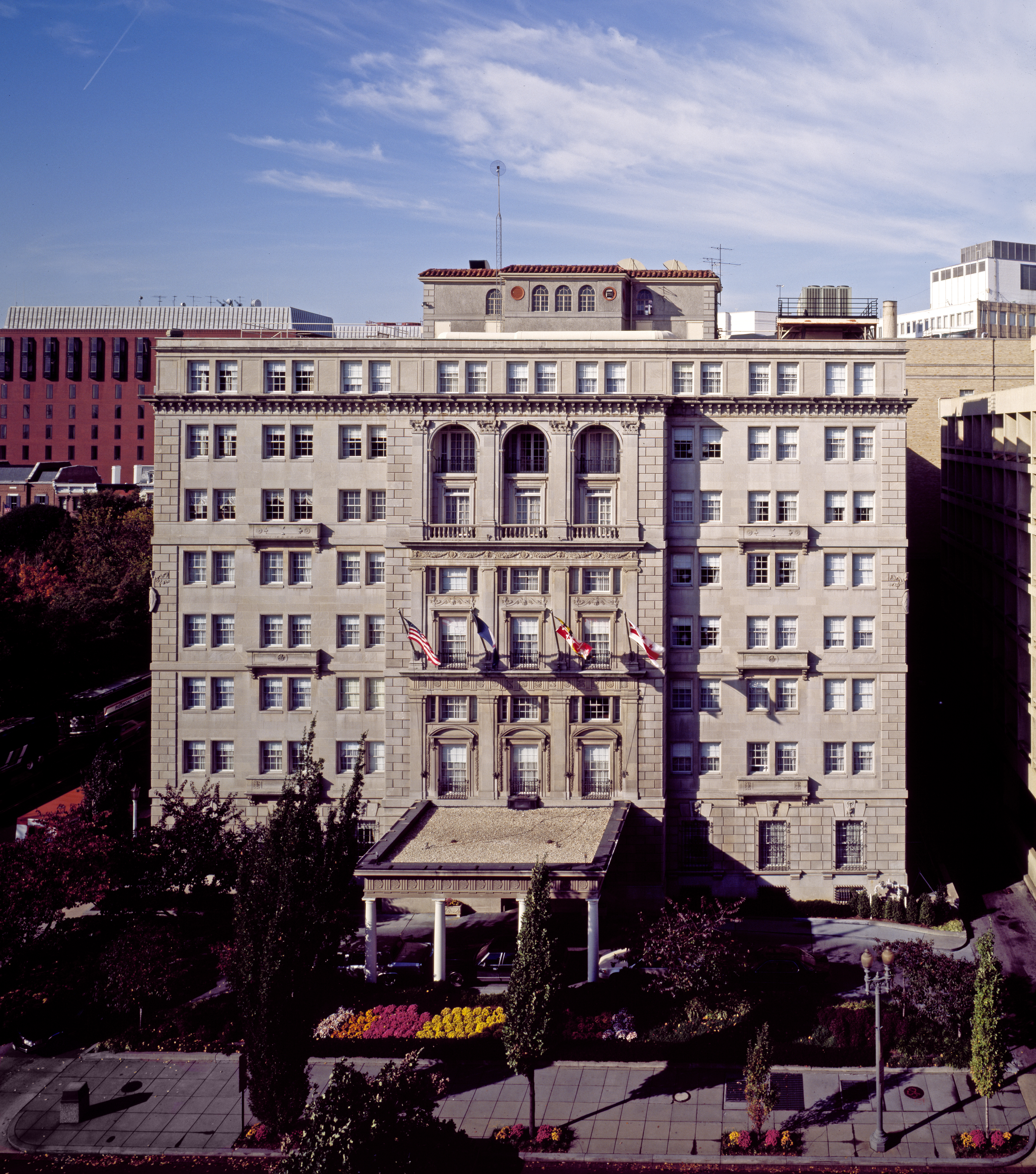
The Hay–Adams Hotel is on Lafayette Square across from the White House.

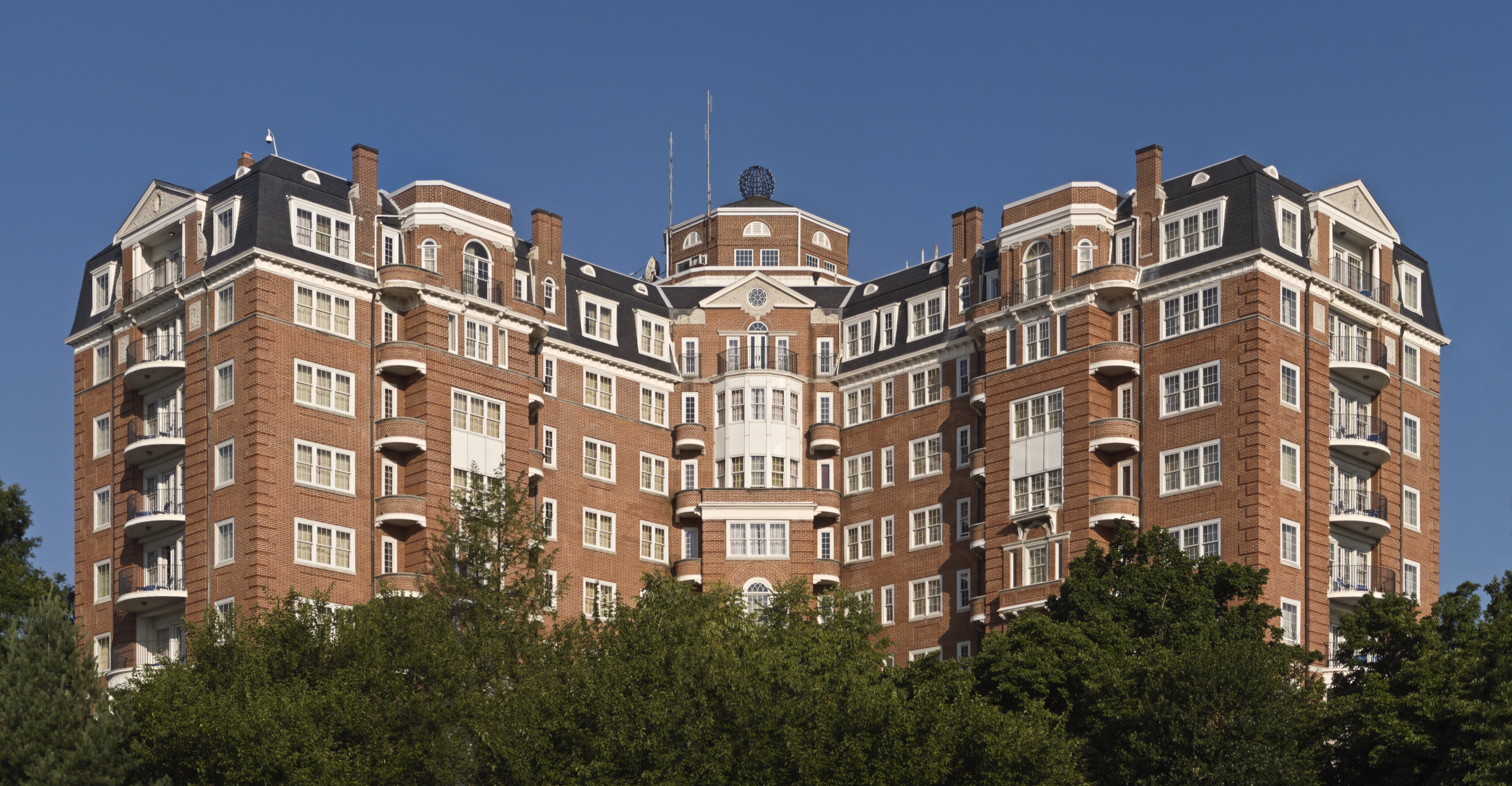
The Wardman Park Tower, designed by Mesrobian in 1928, expanded the original Wardman Park Hotel with an additional eight-stories and a 350-room residential-hotel annex

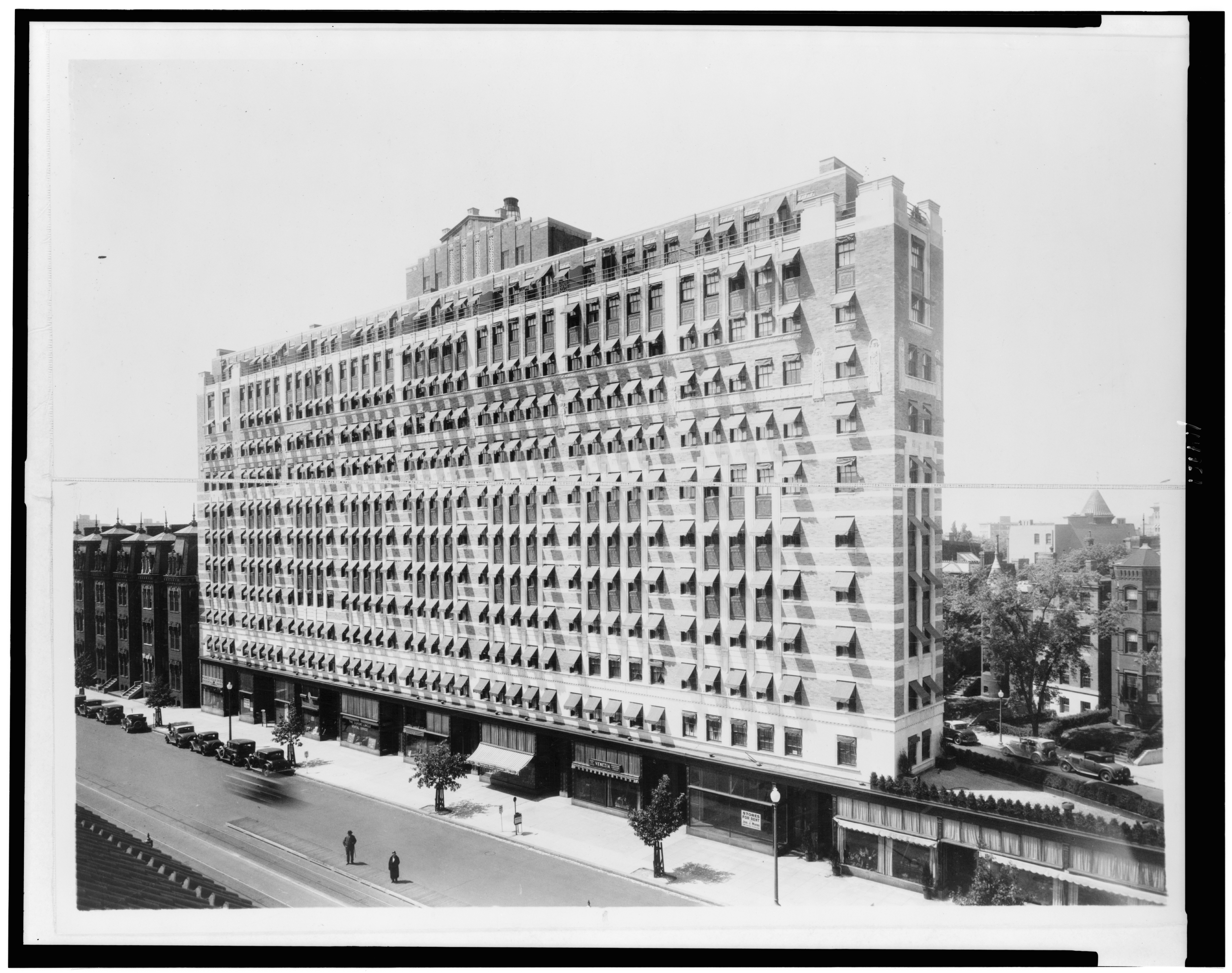
Originally erected as an apartment building, the Dupont Circle Building was designed in the art deco style by Mesrobian in 1931.

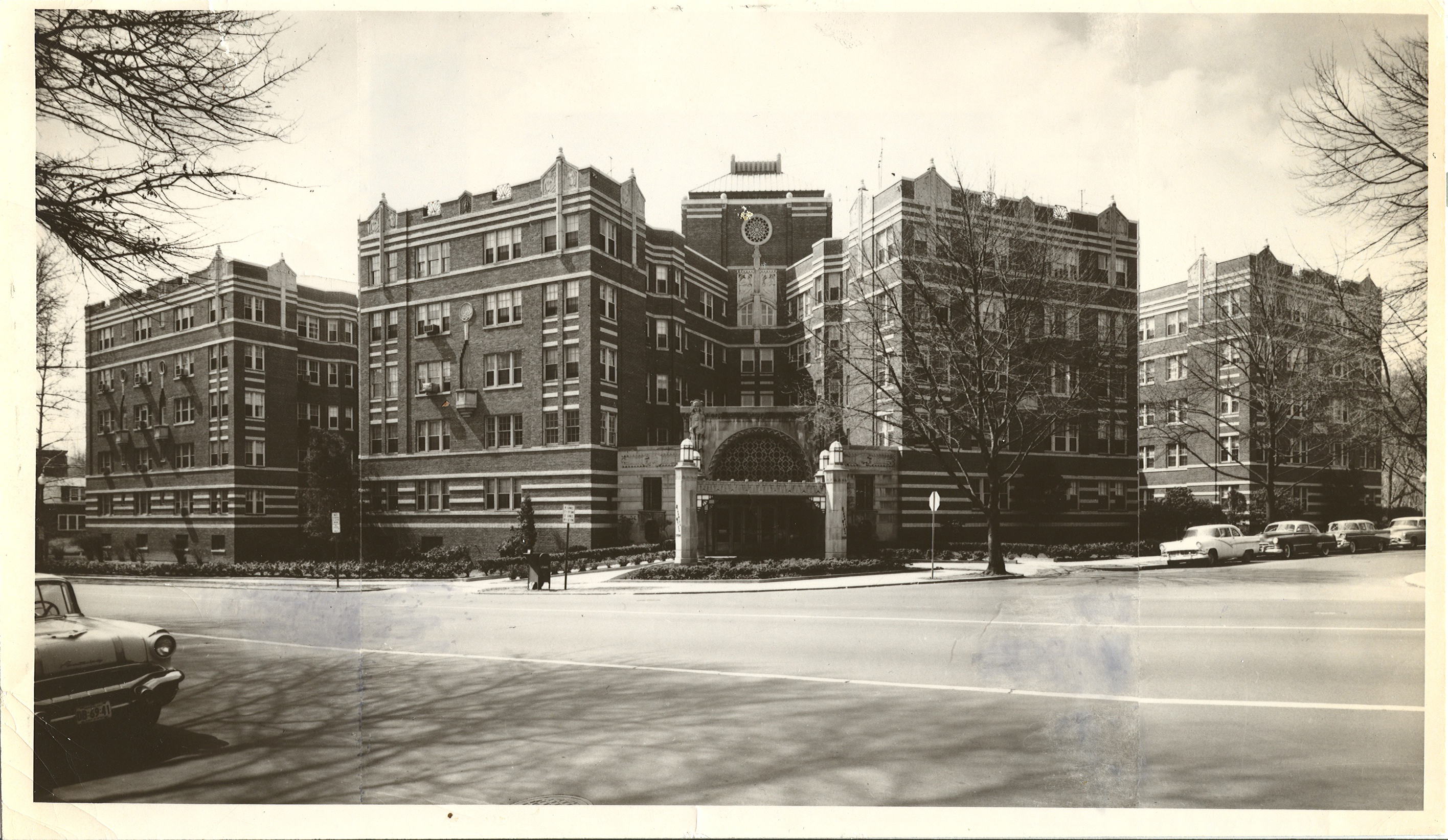
The Sedgwick Gardens, designed by Mesrobian in 1931, has been an exemplary model of Art Deco porte-cochère architecture.

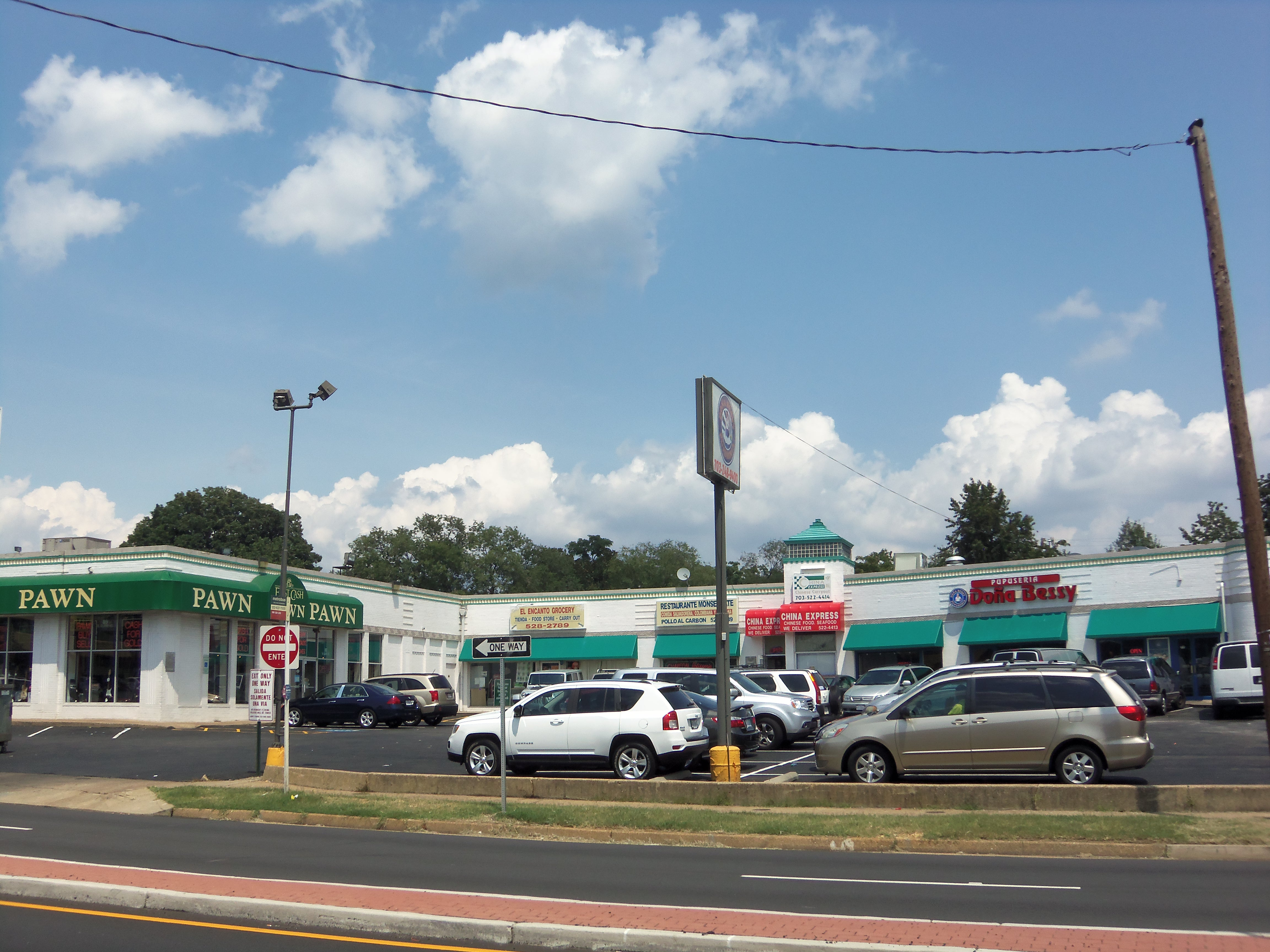
Designed by architect Mesrobian in 1940, the Glebe Center was eventually added to the National Register of Historic Places.

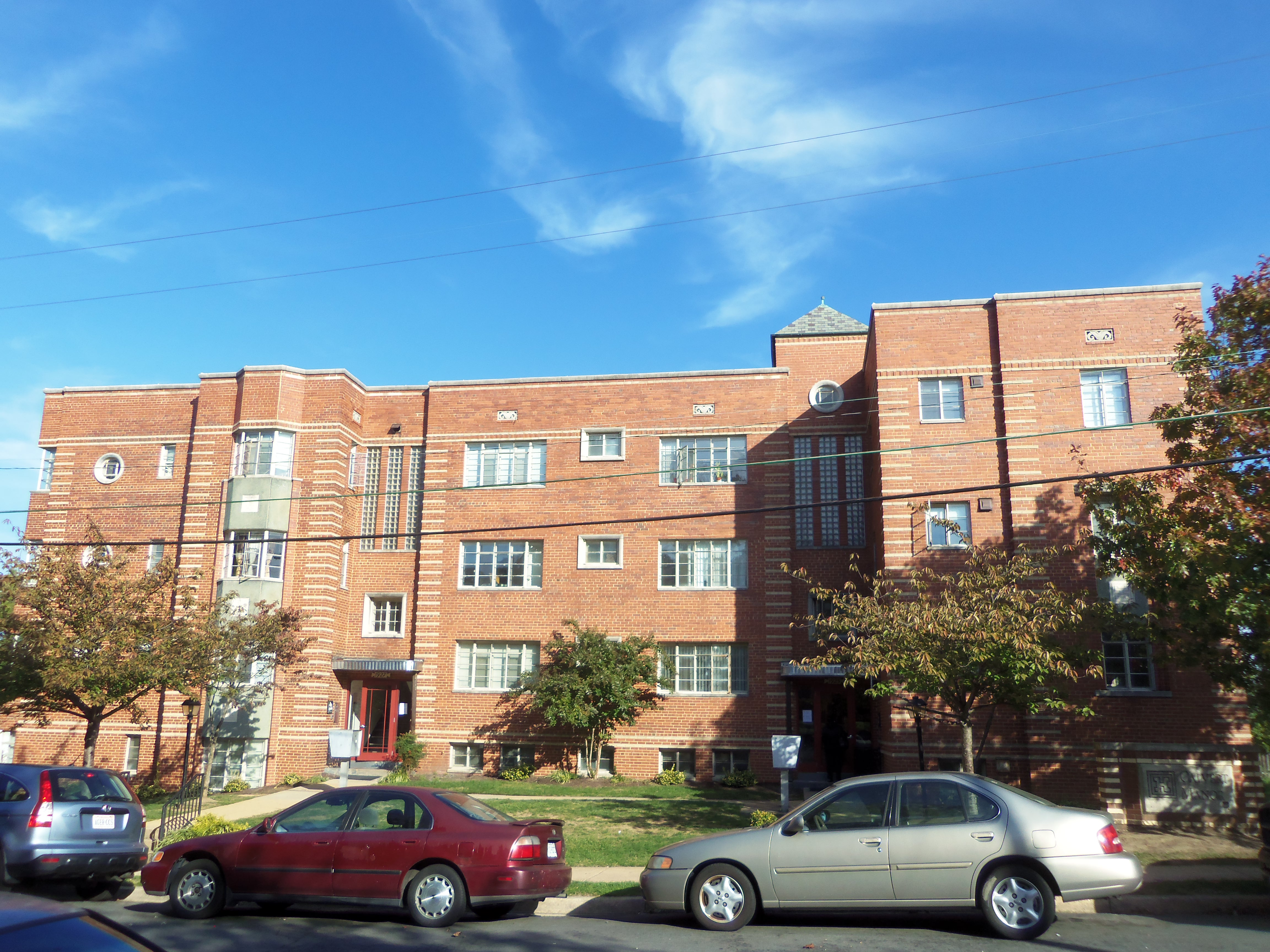
Designed by Mesrobian in 1948 in the Moderne style, Mesrobian was the builder and owner of Calvert Manor.

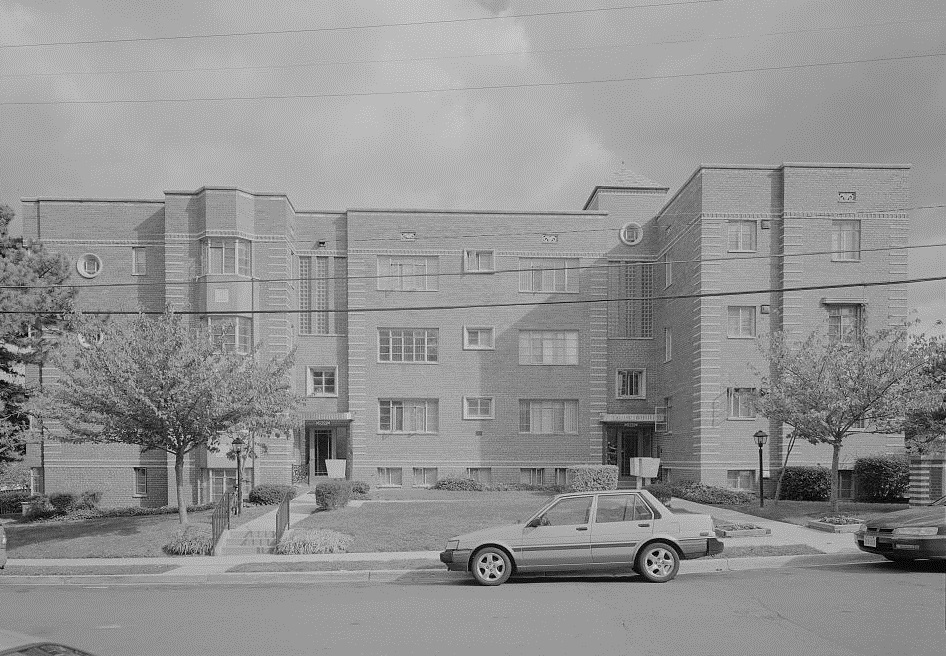
An older photograph of The Calvert Manor, a building added to the National Register of Historic Places.

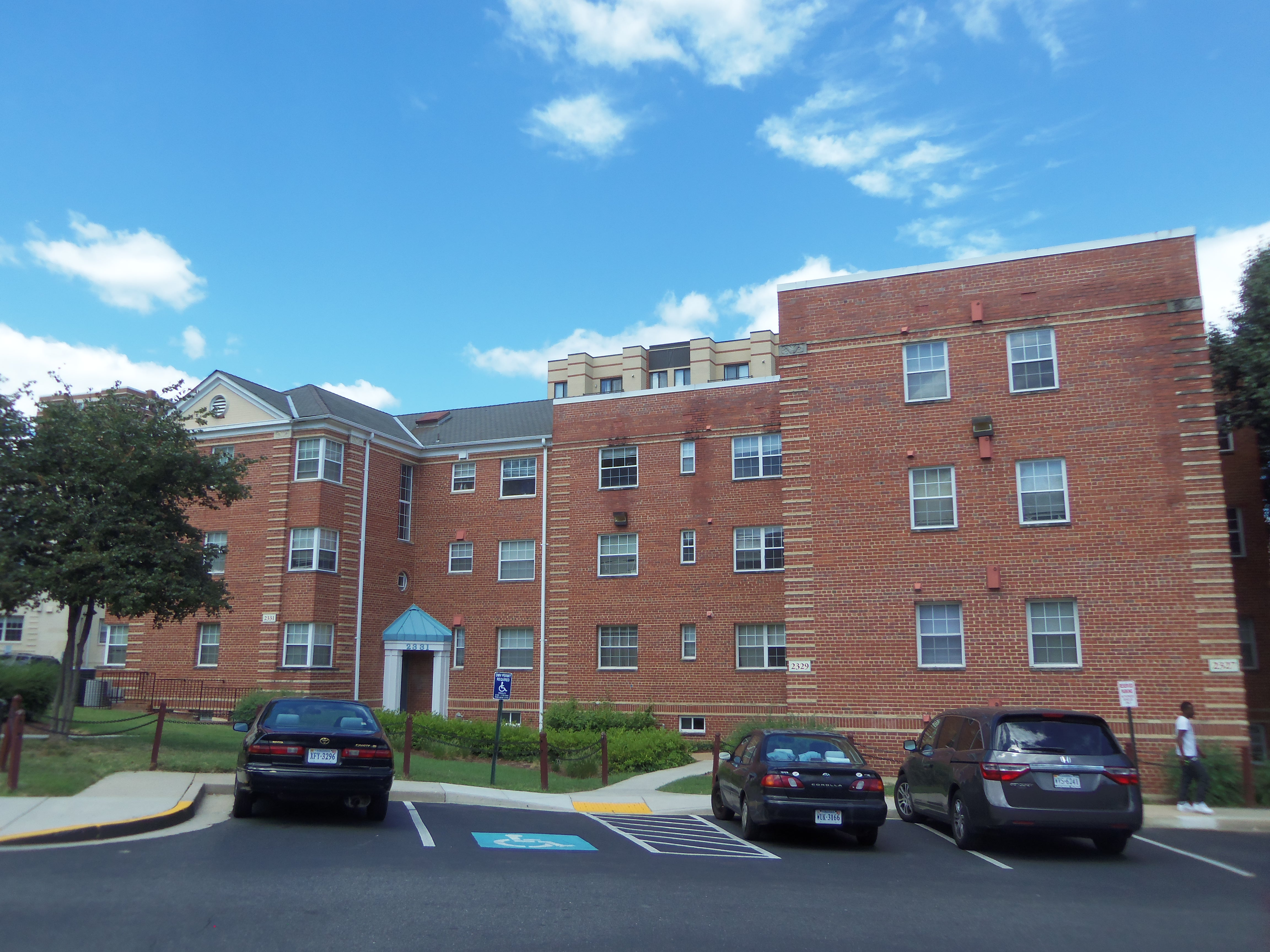
The Lee Gardens North was designed by Mesrobian under standards promoted by the FHA. The brick buildings are in Colonial Revival style, with some influence of Art Deco and Moderne.

== See also ==
- Armenian architecture
- Balyan family
- Sarkis Torossian
