= Lee Gardens North Historic District =

Historic district in Virginia, United States

- U.S. National Register of Historic Places
- U.S. Historic district
- Virginia Landmarks Register
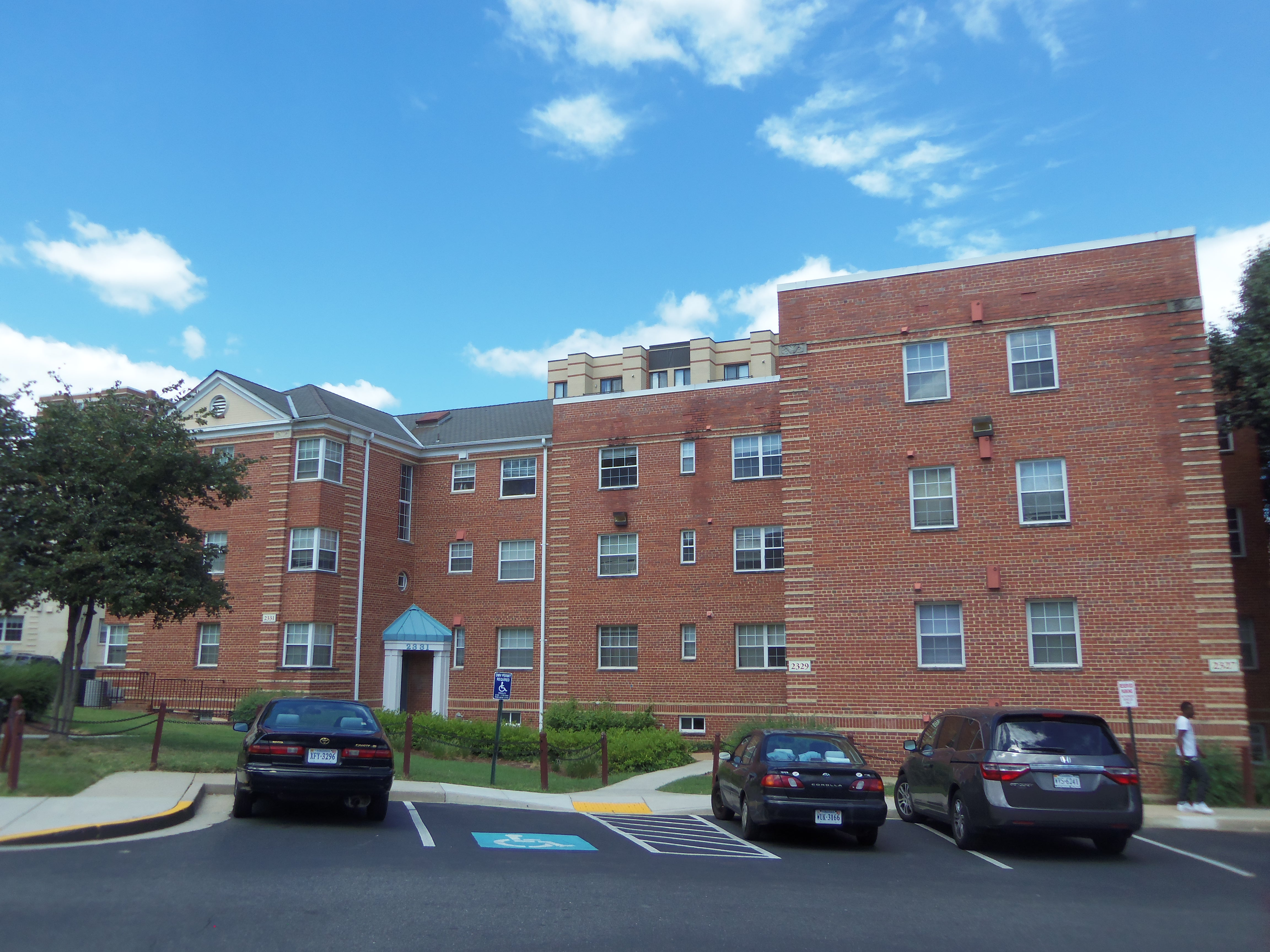

- Location within District of Columbia Location within Virginia Location within the United States
- Location: 2300-2341 N. 11th St., Arlington, Virginia
- Coordinates: 38°53′8″N 77°5′12″W
- Area: 14.5 acres (5.9 ha)
- Built: 1949-1950
- Built by: F & W Construction; et al.
- Architectural style: Colonial Revival, Art Deco, Moderne
- MPS: Garden Apartments, Apartment Houses and Apartment Complexes in Arlington County, Virginia MPS
- NRHP reference No.: 04000109
- VLR No.: 000-9411

Significant dates
- Added to NRHP: February 26, 2004
- Designated VLR: December 3, 2003

The Lee Gardens North Historic District, also known as Woodbury Park Apartments, is a national historic district located at Arlington County, Virginia. It contains thirty attached masonry structures forming seven contributing buildings in a residential neighborhood in north Arlington. The garden apartment complex was designed by architect Mihran Mesrobian according to the original standards promoted by the Federal Housing Administration (FHA). The Lee Gardens North complex was completed in 1949–1950. The brick buildings are in the Colonial Revival style, with some fenestration elements influenced by the Art Deco and Moderne style.

It was listed on the National Register of Historic Places in 2004.
