= United Nations Relief and Rehabilitation Administration =

International relief agency (1943–1947)

- Abbreviation: UNRRA
- Formation: 1943; 83 years ago
- Type: Specialized agency
- Legal status: Inactive
- Headquarters: Dupont Circle Building, Washington, D.C.
- Parent organization: United Nations (from 1945)

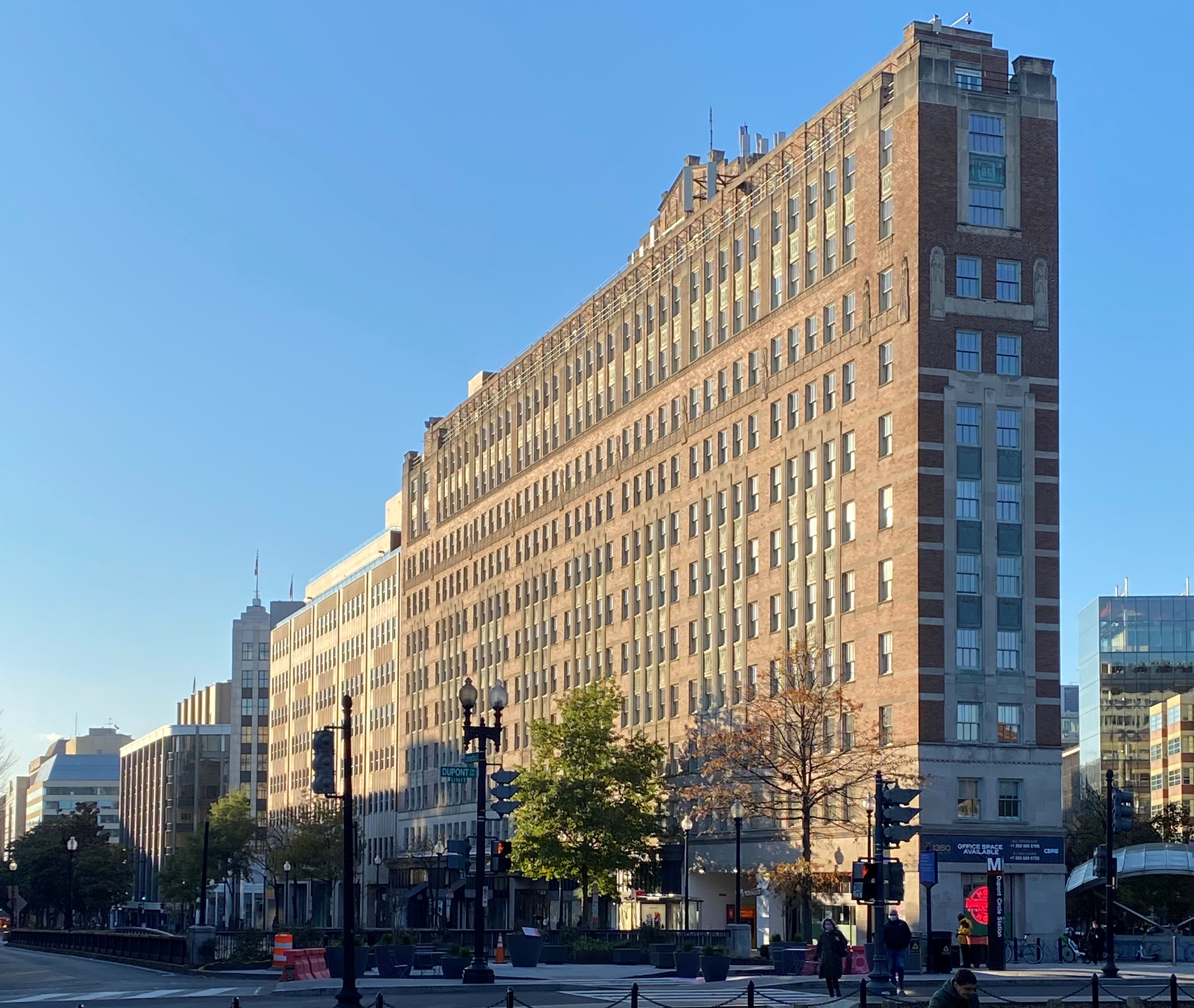
The Dupont Circle Building was the UNRRA head office in Washington DC from October 1944

United Nations Relief and Rehabilitation Administration (UNRRA, pronounced /ˈʌnrə/ UN-rə) was an international relief agency founded in November 1943 on the joint initiative of the United States, the Soviet Union, Britain and China. Its purpose was to "plan, co-ordinate, administer or arrange for the administration of measures for the relief of victims of war in any area under the control of any of the United Nations through the provision of food, fuel, clothing, shelter and other basic necessities, medical and other essential services". Of the aid, 70% originated with the United States, but 44 countries participated in the relief in Europe and Asia. It became part of the United Nations (UN) in 1945 and was dissolved in September 1948. Its staff of civil servants included 12,000 people, with headquarters in New York. Funding came from many nations, and totalled $3.7 billion, of which the United States contributed $2.7 billion; Britain, $625 million; and Canada, $139 million.

UNRRA cooperated closely with dozens of volunteer charitable organizations, which sent hundreds of their own staff to work alongside UNRRA. In operation for only four years, the agency distributed about $4 billion worth of goods, food, medicine, tools, and farm implements at a time of severe global shortages and worldwide transportation difficulties. The recipient nations had been especially hard hit by starvation, dislocation, and political chaos. It played a major role in helping displaced persons return to their home countries in Europe in 1945–46.

Many of its functions were transferred to several UN agencies, including the International Refugee Organization and the World Health Organization. As an American relief project, it was later replaced by the Marshall Plan, which began operations in 1948. However, the historian Jessica Reinisch has proposed that UNRRA should not just figure as a chapter in U.S. history, but rather that UNRRA was unique in that it managed to bring together very different partners and models of international relief, each of which had their own history and antecedents.

== Founding and authority ==
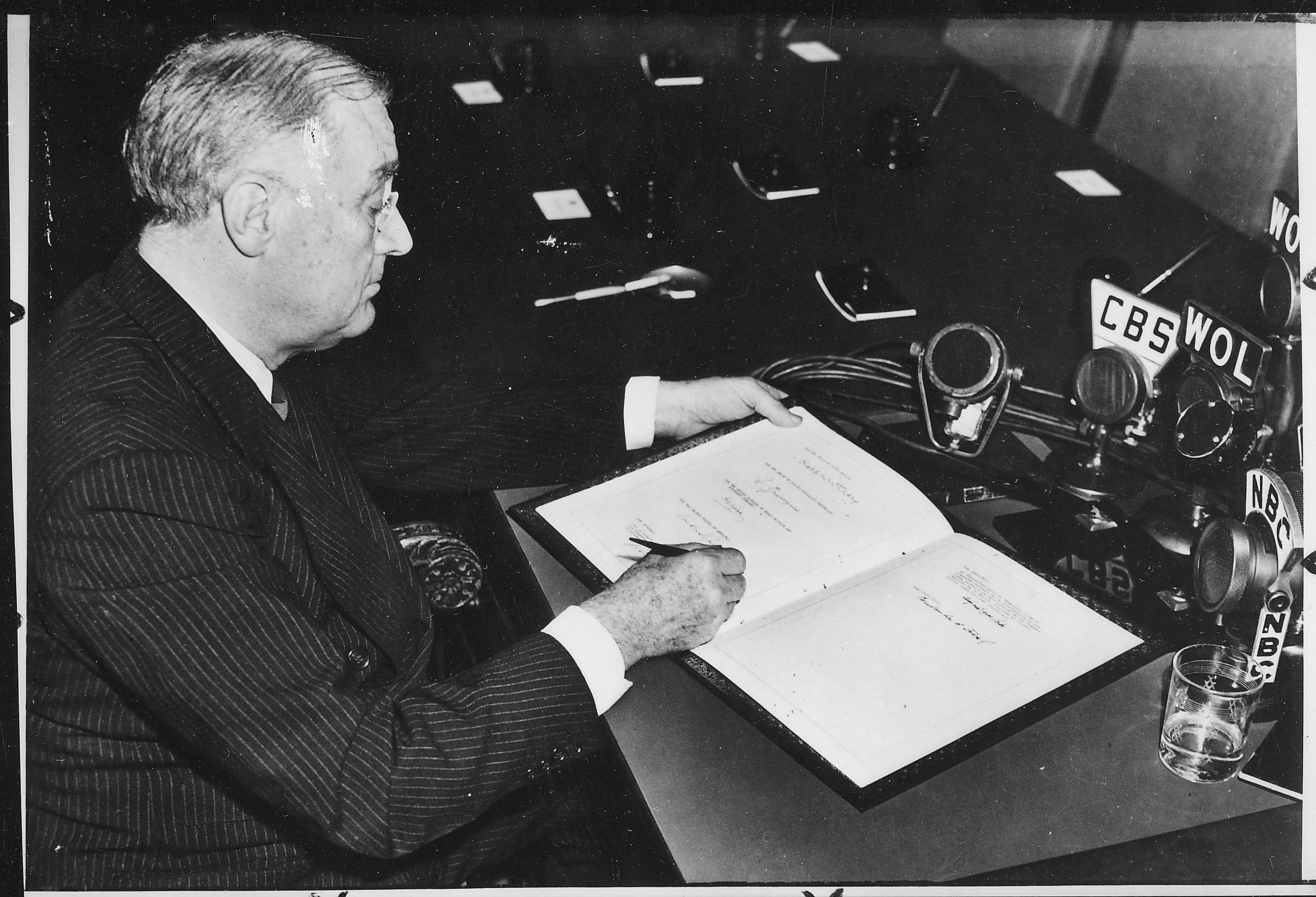
Franklin Roosevelt signs the pact establishing the UNRRA immediately before a national radio address (9 November 1943).

The First World War displaced more refugees than in Europeans' living memory, first from Belgium in 1914, later in eastern Europe, cf. the civil wars and new national boundaries of 1917–19. Relief was undertaken largely by private charities, often American as organized by Herbert Hoover. The Second World War seemed likely to create still more refugees, prompting governments to act: U.S. president Franklin Delano Roosevelt proposed the agency in June 1943, to provide relief to areas liberated from Axis Powers when the fighting ended. Roosevelt had already obtained the approval of the United Kingdom, the Soviet Union, and China; he later obtained endorsements from 40 other governments to form the first "United Nations" organization.

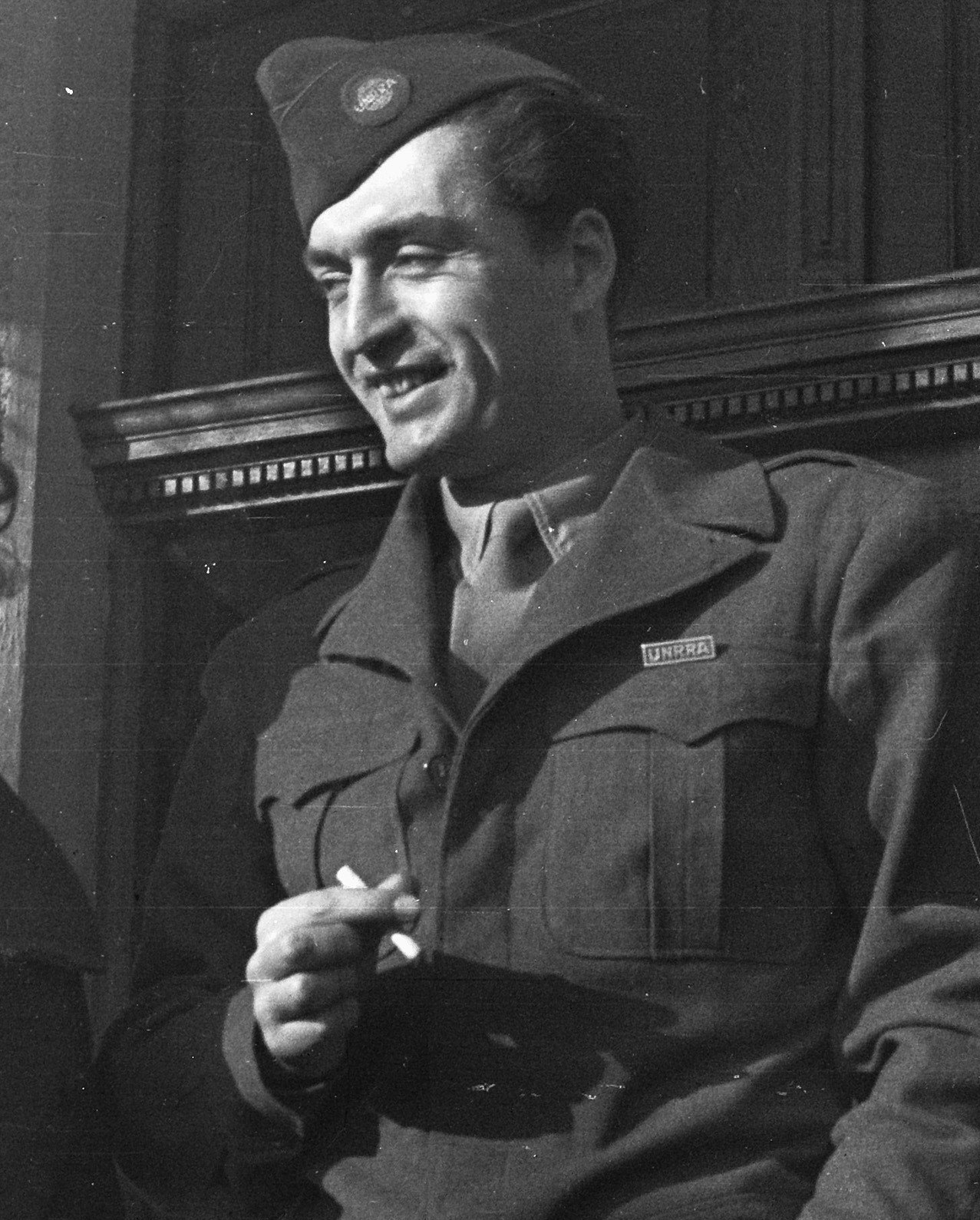
Soldier of the UNRRA, March 1946

The Agreement for United Nations Relief and Rehabilitation Administration founding document was signed by 44 countries in the White House in Washington on 9 November 1943. UNRRA was headed by a Director-General and governed by a Council (composed of representatives of all state parties) with a Central Committee representing the United States, Britain, China and the Soviet Union. The other countries who signed the agreement included: Australia, Belgium, Bolivia, Brazil, Canada, Chile, Colombia, Costa Rica, Cuba, Czechoslovakia, Dominican Republic, Ecuador, Egypt, El Salvador, Ethiopia, the French Committee of National Liberation, Greece, Guatemala, Haiti, Honduras, Iceland, India, Iran, Iraq, Liberia, Luxembourg, Mexico, Netherlands, New Zealand, Nicaragua, Norway, Panama, Paraguay, Peru, Philippines, Poland, South Africa, Uruguay, Venezuela and Yugoslavia.

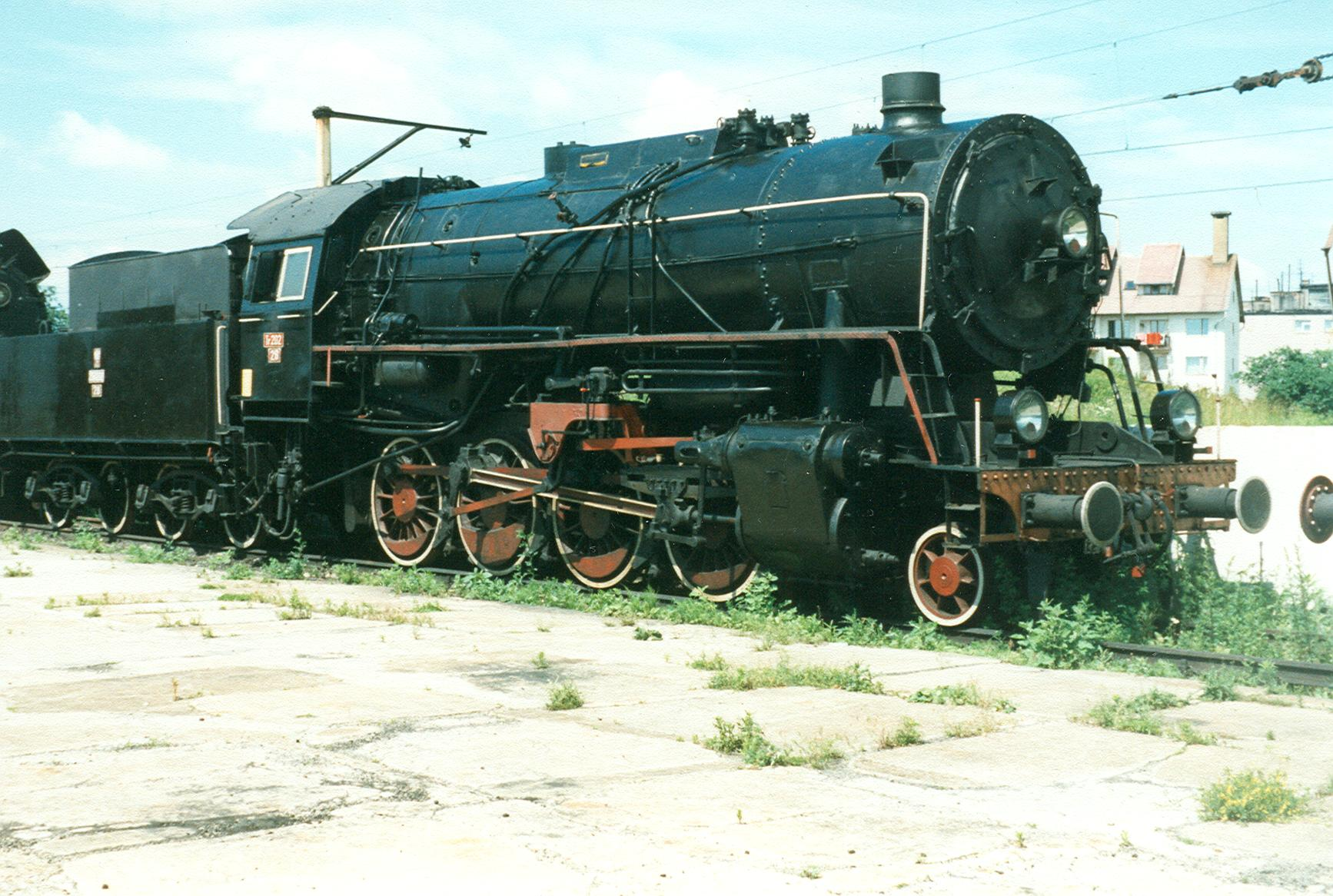
One of UNRRA-delivered British Liberation Class locomotives (named Tr202 series in Poland)

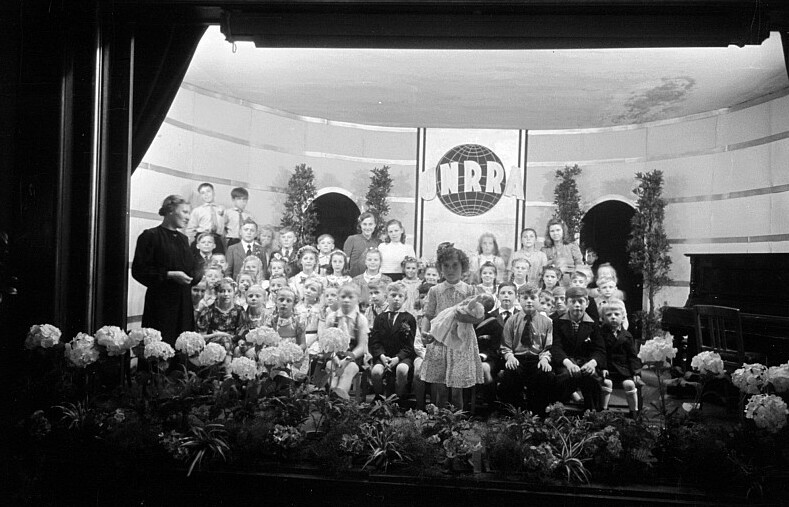
Mother's Day in UNRRA displaced persons camp in Germany

Although the UNRRA was called a "United Nations" agency, it was established prior to the founding of the United Nations. The explanation for this is that the term "United Nations" was used at the time to refer to the Allies of World War II, having been originally coined for that purpose by Roosevelt in 1942.

Although initially restricted by its constitution to render aid only to nationals from the United Nations (the Allies), this was changed late in 1944, in response to pleas from Jewish organizations who were concerned with the fate of surviving Jews of German nationality, to also include "other persons who have been obliged to leave their country or place of origin or former residence or who have been deported therefrom by action of the enemy because of race, religion or activities in favor of the United Nations."

UNRRA operated in occupied Germany, primarily in camps for displaced persons, especially the 11,000,000 non-Germans who had been moved into Germany during the war, but did not render assistance to ethnic Germans.

In Asia, the organization provided assistance in the Dutch East Indies, Korea, and China (including Taiwan). China was the largest recipient of funds.

UNRRA Headquarters was in Washington, D.C., and the European Regional Office was set up in London. The organization was subject to the authority of the Supreme Headquarters of the Allied Expeditionary Forces (SHAEF) in Europe and was directed by three Americans during the four years of its existence:

- Herbert Lehman (1 January 1944−31 March 1946), former Governor of New York
- Fiorello La Guardia (1 April−31 December 1946), former Mayor of New York, who later learned that his sister Gemma and other relatives had been imprisoned in Nazi concentration camps
- Lowell Ward Rooks (1 January 1947−30 September 1948)

== Operations ==
UNRRA funds became a point of tension in the relations between the United States and Chiang Kai-shek's Nationalist government of China when Chiang pushed to control the disposition of funds in China to ensure that relief funds did not go to the Communist-governed areas of the country. These tensions worsened during the Chinese Civil War.

By 1947, UNRRA was running nearly 800 resettlement camps, housing over 700,000 people. Forty-four nations contributed to funding, supplying, and staffing the agency, of which the United States was the leading donor. The largest recipients of UNRRA commodity aid, in millions of US dollars were China, $518; Poland – $478; Italy – $418; Yugoslavia – $416; Greece – $347; Czechoslovakia – $261; Ukraine (USSR) – $188; and Austria – $136. A number of academic assessments state that UNRRA was not perfect and was troubled by inefficiency, poor planning, shortages of supplies, and some incompetent personnel. On balance however, many argue that it was a major success in terms of delivering aid, food, and medicine, and helping Europe on the path to recovery, especially Eastern and Southern Europe.

By 1946, opposition to UNRRA grew in American government due to its actions in communist countries in Europe, specifically US-subsidised relief operations for countries in Central and Eastern Europe devastated by World War 2. By the end of 1946, UNRRA came under criticism by US congress for 'the use of American funds for relief to countries under Communist influence.' UNRRA was judged as a failure for failing to get political concessions from countries it assisted, and giving aid to countries the American government considered hostile. The UNRRA's legacy in American government became an example of what not to do, with one memorandum in 1947 talking of the importance of ensuring that 'The United States must run this show’ on the issue of future aid programs.

== In popular culture ==
The activities of the UNRRA, as well as the plight of displaced orphans in post-war Europe, is portrayed in Fred Zinnemann’s contemporaneous film The Search. The child actor in the film, Ivan Jandl, was awarded a special Academy Juvenile Award and a Golden Globe Award for his portrayal of Karel Malik. Jandl was prohibited from attending either ceremony by the Czech communist government.

=== Music ===
UNRRA is referenced in the Polish song "Nie masz cwaniaka nad Warszawiaka" composed by Albert Harris.

UNRRA is the subject of the 1946 Polish foxtrot song "UNRRA, UNRRA" (music by Jerzy Łabęga, lyrics by St. Lenc), a satirical piece about a family receiving and misunderstanding the contents of a UNRRA relief package due to their inability to read English labels.

=== Films ===
- U.N.R.R.A. presents In the Wake of the Armies ..., a 1944 National Film Board of Canada documentary about the U.N.R.R.A.
- The Search (Director: Fred Zinnemann, Starring: Montgomery Clift) 1948 Filmed in post-war Berlin: A story which brings to life UNRRA work in 1945 Germany.
- Sami swoi, 1967 - a Polish comedy on post-war peasant life, in which an UNRRA-delivered horse is an important action point.

== See also ==
- CARE
- CRALOG
- Chinese National Relief and Rehabilitation Administration
- GARIOA
- Heifers for Relief
- Seagoing cowboys
- Dupont Circle Building
