= The St. Regis Washington, D.C. =

- Carlton Hotel
- U.S. National Register of Historic Places
- U.S. Historic district – Contributing property
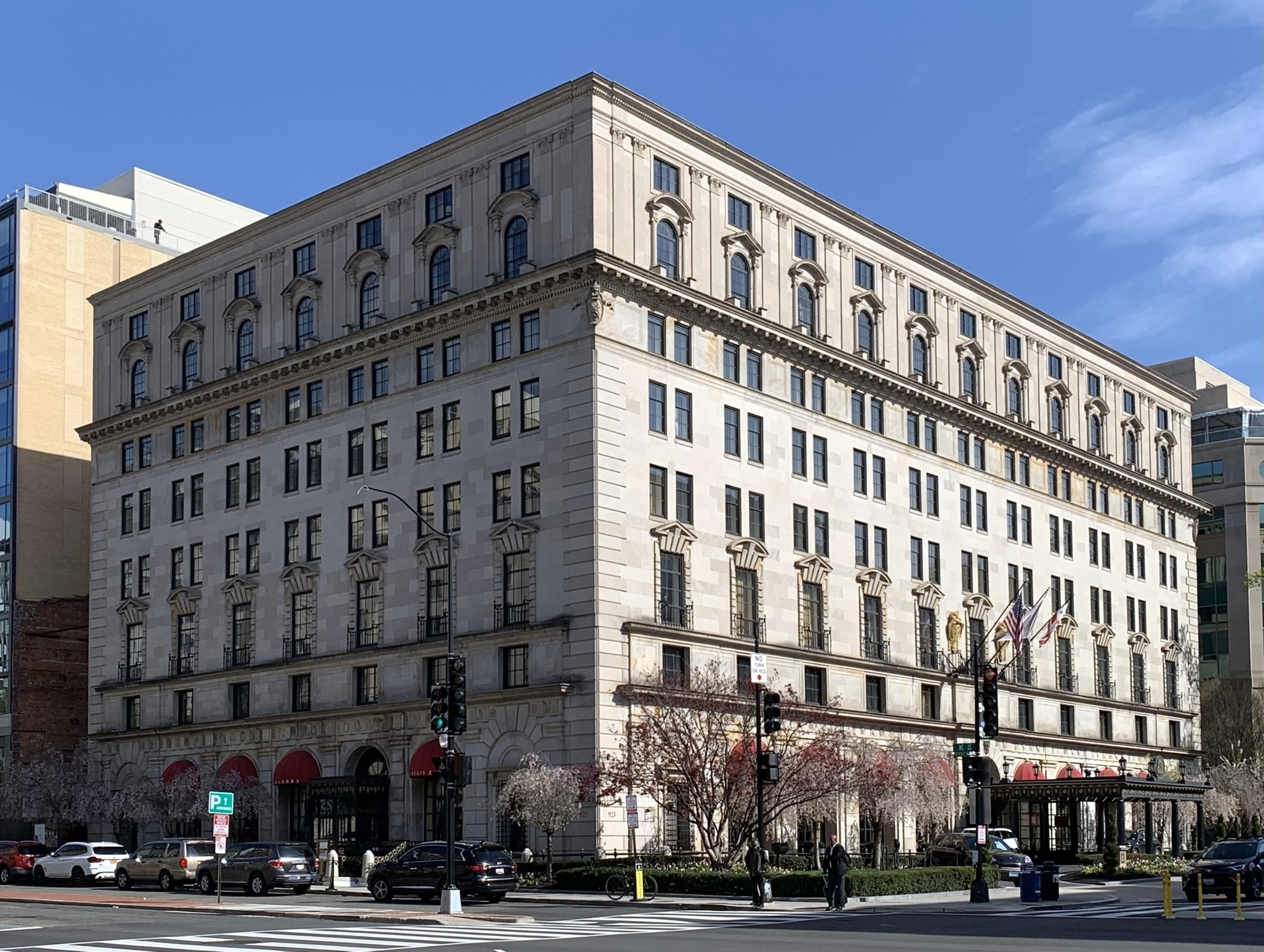
- The St. Regis Washington, D.C. in 2022

- Location within Washington, D.C.
- Location: 923 16th Street NW, Washington, D.C.
- Coordinates: 38°54′7.5″N 77°2′10.2″W
- Built: 1926; 100 years ago
- Architect: Mihran Mesrobian
- Architectural style: Beaux Arts
- Part of: Sixteenth Street Historic District (ID78003060)
- NRHP reference No.: 90000911
- Added to NRHP: June 28, 1990

The St. Regis Washington, D.C. known for many years as the Carlton Hotel, is an historic hotel located at 923 16th and K streets, N.W. in Washington, D.C. two blocks north of the White House.

== History ==
=== 20th century ===
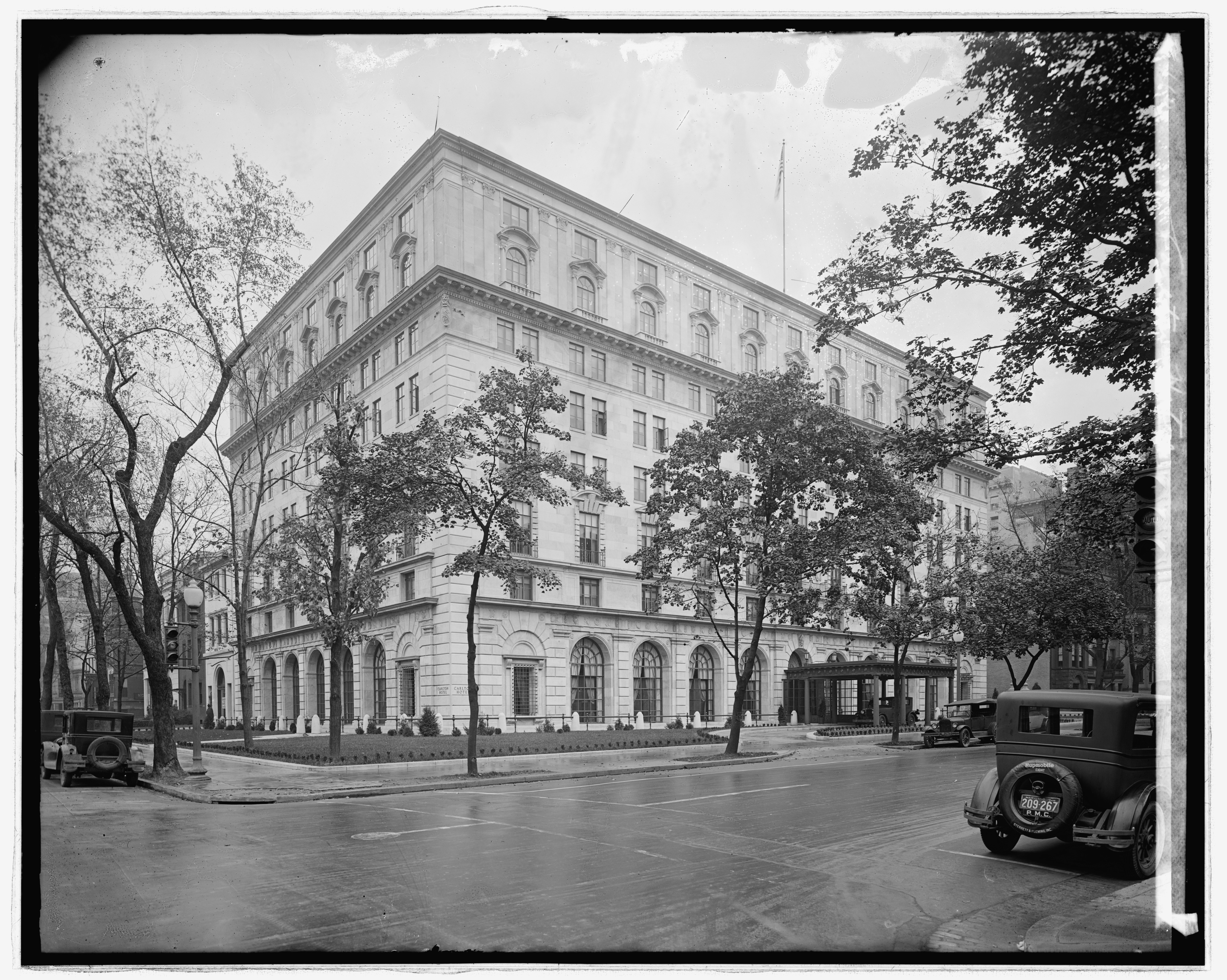
Carlton Hotel, 1926

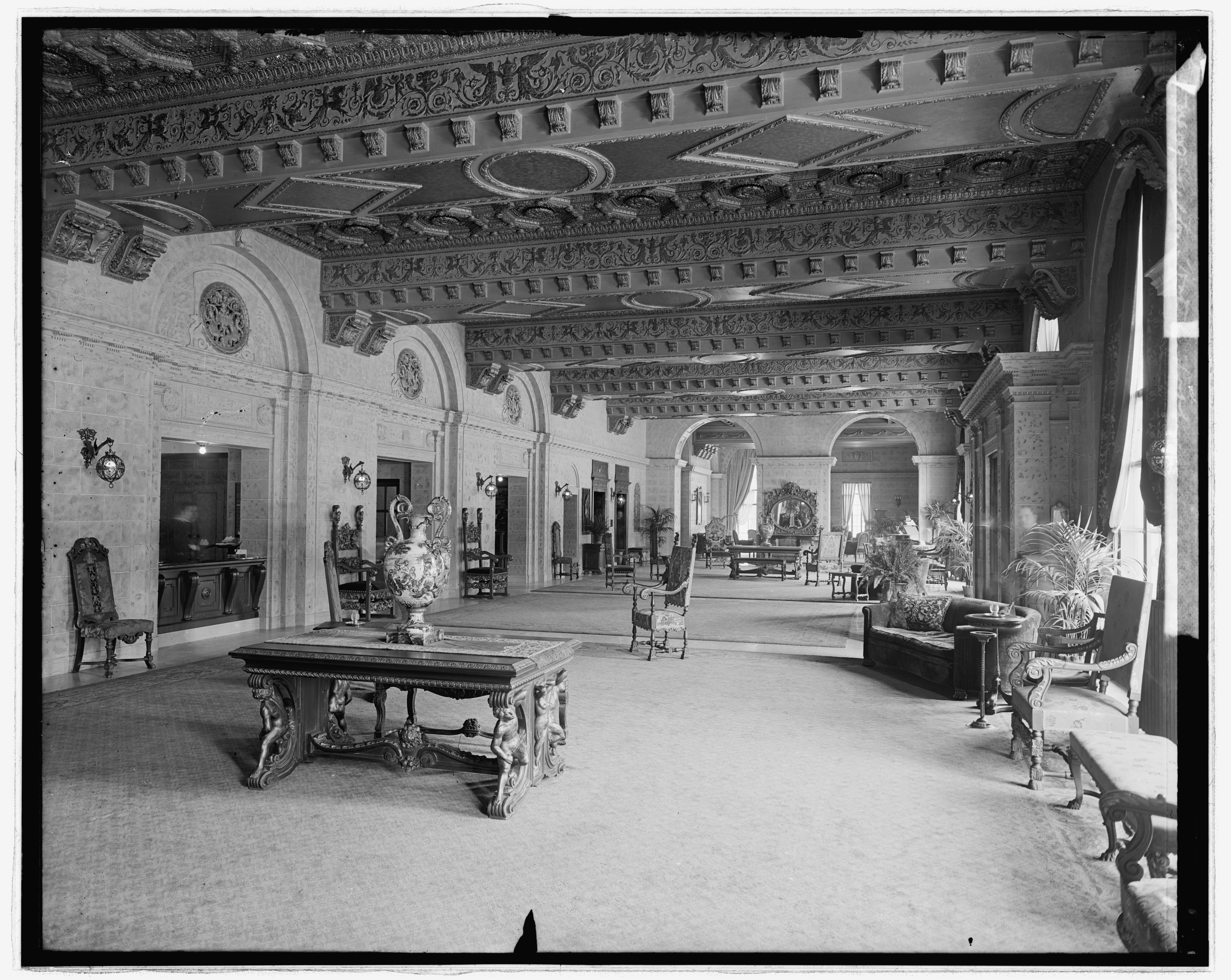
Carlton Hotel lobby, 1926

The Carlton Hotel was built by local developer Harry Wardman and opened on October 1, 1926. It was designed in a mix of the Beaux-Arts and Neo-Renaissance styles by architect Mihran Mesrobian. Cordell Hull lived there during World War II.

Wardman was forced to sell the hotel in 1930, due to the Great Depression. The hotel was sold, along with the Wardman Park Hotel, to Sheraton Hotels on May 27, 1953. The new owners renamed the hotel the Sheraton-Carlton Hotel.

In December 1987, The Sheraton-Carlton closed for extensive renovations, costing $16 million. The hotel's guest rooms were entirely gutted and enlarged, reducing their number from 250 to 200. The Sheraton Carlton began receiving guests again on October 1, 1988, the anniversary of its original opening. The hotel's grand reopening was celebrated on October 6, 1988. The hotel was renamed The Carlton - An ITT Sheraton Luxury Hotel in 1991. On April 6, 1999, Starwood Hotels & Resorts renamed the hotel The St. Regis Washington, D.C.

=== 21st century ===
In 2007, Claret Capital, a real estate investment firm based in Dublin, Ireland, purchased the hotel for about $170 million. Claret renovated the property in 2008, but the Great Recession significantly hurt both the luxury hotel industry and the Irish economy, and Claret Capital was not able to continue making payments on the loan it had secured from Barclays Capital. Barclays foreclosed on the hotel in September 2010, and announced plans to auction off the property.

Westbrook Partners, a real estate investment firm based in New York City, purchased The St. Regis from Barclays in May 2011 for $100 million. Westbrook renovated the lobby and main bar in 2013. That same year, the hotel's high-end restaurant, Adour, closed and was replaced by a more moderately priced establishment, Decanter, which was owned and managed by the hotel itself.

Westbrook Partners sold The St. Regis to Al Rayyan Tourism Investment Co. (ARTIC), a hotel and resort investment company based in Qatar, for an undisclosed sum in July 2015. Included in the purchase was a 22,000 square feet (2,000 m^{2}), two-story building next to the hotel. ARTIC said that the hotel would continue to be branded a St. Regis.

The hotel is listed on the National Register of Historic Places, and is designated as a contributing property to the Sixteenth Street Historic District.

== Ratings and reviews ==
The AAA gave the hotel four diamonds out of five in 2008. The hotel has maintained that rating every year, and received four diamonds again for 2016. Forbes Travel Guide (formerly known as Mobil Guide) awarded the hotel four out of five stars as well in 2016.
