= Hay–Adams Hotel =

Luxury hotel in Washington, D.C., US

The Hay–Adams
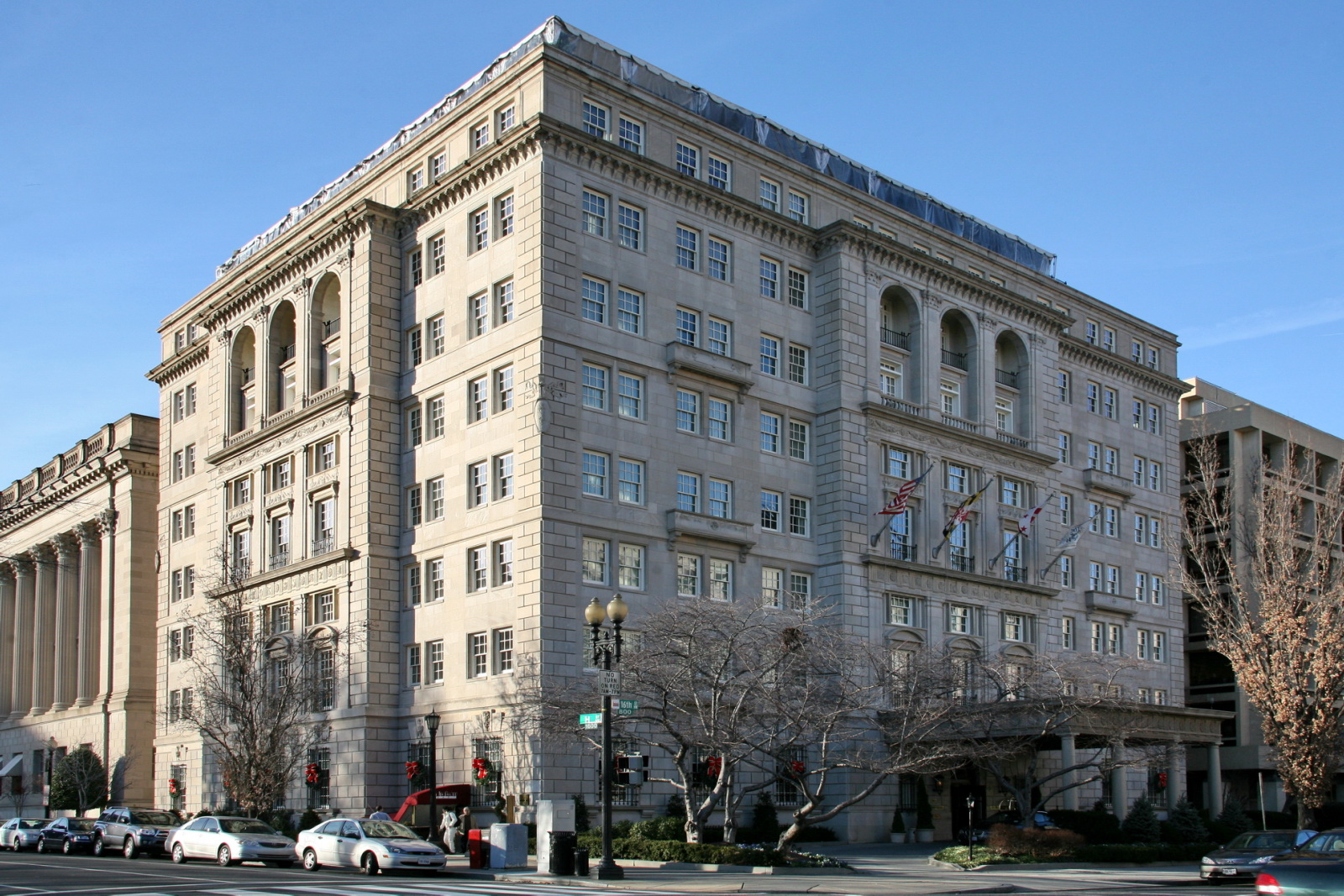
- The Hay–Adams
- Interactive map of the The Hay–Adams area

General information
- Location: Lafayette Square; Sixteenth & H Streets; N.W. Washington, D.C. 20006
- Coordinates: 38.9004°N 77.037°W
- Opening: 1928
- Owner: B. F. Saul Company
- Operator: The Hay-Adams Management Company LLC

Design and construction
- Architect: Mihran Mesrobian
- Developer: Harry Wardman

Other information
- Number of rooms: 145
- Number of suites: 20
- Number of restaurants: 2

Website
- Hayadams.com

The Hay–Adams is an historic luxury hotel opened in 1928, located at 800 16th Street NW in Washington, D.C. It south-fronts on Lafayette Square across from the White House. It sits on the former site of connected 19th-century mansions, which were owned by two influential friends, John Hay and Henry Adams, which led to the hotel's naming.

== Location ==
Lafayette Square and St. John's Episcopal Church, also known as the Church of the Presidents, are located across the street. The hotel is a contributing property to the Lafayette Square Historic District and Sixteenth Street Historic District and is also a member of the Historic Hotels of America.

== History ==
The hotel occupies the site where the 1885 homes of John Hay and Henry Adams once stood, at 16th and H Streets NW. In 1927, Washington developer Harry Wardman bought the property, razed the homes, and built a 138-room residential hotel, designed by architect Mihran Mesrobian in the Italian Renaissance style. The hotel opened in 1928 as The Hay–Adams House. Wardman's fortunes declined with the Great Depression, and he was forced to relinquish most of his hotel and apartment building empire in August 1930, with the exception of The Hay–Adams House. Finally, in 1932, Wardman defaulted on the hotel's loans, and it was sold at public auction to the Washington Loan and Trust Company.

Hotel magnate Julius Manger purchased the property in 1932 and renamed it the Manger Hay–Adams Hotel. He converted it to a transient hotel, remodeling the guest rooms and adding central air-conditioning. Manger owned 18 hotels in New York City, the Hotel Plaza in Chicago, and the Hotel Manger at North Station in Boston. During the Depression he sought to increase his holdings in Washington, D.C., which he felt was a safe investment. He also purchased the Annapolis and Hamilton hotels in Washington. Manger resided at the Hay-Adams until his death in March 1937. At the time of his death, Manger was the largest independent hotel operator in the United States.

The Manger family sold the hotel to Washington developer Sheldon Magazine in 1973, and it was renamed The Hay–Adams. Magazine sold the hotel to businessman Jeffrey I. Friedman and French hotelier Georges F. Mosse in 1979 for approximately $15 million. Friedman and Mosse sold the hotel to Los Angeles businessman David H. Murdock in 1983 for $30 million. Murdock sold the hotel to the Iue Family, founders of Sanyo, in 1989 for $54 million. The Iue family sold the hotel to the B. F. Saul Company, a Washington real estate company, in 2006, for $100 million.

== Notable guests ==
President-elect Barack Obama and his family stayed in the Hay–Adams for two weeks before his inauguration because the Blair House was occupied.

== In popular culture ==
Frank Underwood, the main protagonist in the House of Cards television series, stayed in this hotel after resigning the Office of President of the United States until his death in 2017.

== Haunting ==
The Hay–Adams is said to be haunted by Henry Adams's beloved wife, "Clover" (Marian Hooper Adams), who committed suicide on this site in 1885, before the hotel was built. Her spirit is said to be walking the floors, trailed by the scent of almond. Potassium cyanide, the home darkroom chemical she ingested, smells like almonds.

== Rating ==
The AAA gave the hotel four diamonds out of five in 1984. The hotel has maintained that rating every year, and received four diamonds again for 2016. Forbes Travel Guide (formerly known as Mobil Guide) awarded the hotel four out of five stars as well in 2016.

The Hay–Adams' slogan is "Where nothing is overlooked but the White House."
