= Capital Garage =

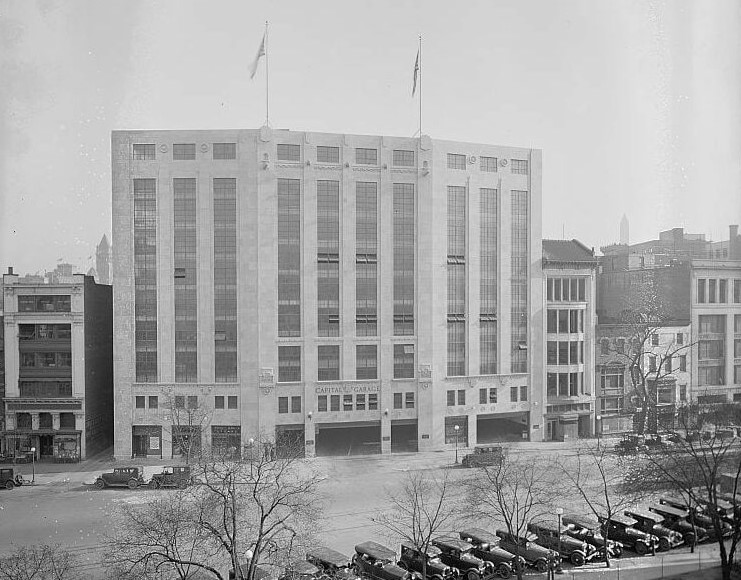
- Capital Garage soon after opening
- Interactive map of the Capital Garage area

General information
- Architectural style: Streamline Moderne; Gothic Revival
- Location: 1320 New York Avenue NW, Washington, DC, United-States
- Coordinates: 38°53′57″N 77°01′50″W
- Completed: 1927
- Demolished: 1974

Design and construction
- Architect: Arthur B. Heaton

The Capital Garage was a ten-story parking garage that once stood at 1320 New York Avenue NW in downtown Washington, D.C. It was built for the Shannon & Luchs real estate firm and designed by local architect Arthur B. Heaton, whose landmark buildings in the city include Riggs National Bank, Stockton Hall, and the Churchill Hotel. The building was designed in the Streamline Moderne architectural style with Gothic Revival features. Ornamental details on its façade included bas-reliefs of automobiles and headlights as well as lion-headed grotesques. In addition to providing parking spaces, the Capital Garage also included a gas station, carwash, repair shop, and retail space.

There was a need for parking in downtown Washington, D.C., due to increased car ownership in the 1920s, and once completed, the building was reportedly the largest parking structure of its kind in the country. It proved to be popular with customers and local businesses. During World War II, the US government leased the building for government vehicles and storage space. It later housed a car dealership and was the site of a fundraiser featuring a vehicle once driven by Adolf Hitler. Due to the increase in automobile size in the 1950s and 1960s, the parking spaces became too small for many vehicles. The decrease in business eventually resulted in the Capital Garage closing in 1973. The building was imploded the following year, but several of the bas-reliefs were saved and donated to the Smithsonian's National Museum of American History. The site now houses the Inter-American Development Bank office building.

== History ==
=== Construction and design ===
During the 1920s, with the advent of increased car ownership, there was a serious need for additional parking in downtown Washington, D.C. In 1926, real estate firm Shannon & Luchs purchased the building at 1302 New York Avenue NW, which formerly housed the Halls of the Ancients, a museum focused on ancient art and architecture that was built in 1898 and closed in 1905. The building was demolished, and construction soon began on a new parking garage, reportedly the largest parking structure in the country. Shannon & Luchs selected a construction company owned by James Baird to build the garage.

The firm hired local architect Arthur B. Heaton (1875-1951) to design the garage. Heaton had already designed numerous commercial and residential buildings in the city, including the Equitable Bank Building, Riggs National Bank, Corcoran Hall, Stockton Hall, The Augusta, The Highlands (now the Churchill Hotel), and would later design the Park and Shop, the nation's first planned neighborhood shopping center which was also developed by Shannon & Luchs. Heaton was an avid car enthusiast and received one of the city's first driving permits in 1900. His interest in cars was reflected in the exterior design features of the Capital Garage.

The total cost for the building project, including land and construction, was around $2,000,000. The Capital Garage was designed in the Streamline Moderne architectural style with Gothic Revival details. It was built on the 1300 block of New York Avenue NW where it intersects with 13th and H Streets. The angular shape of the lot resulted in the garage being constructed in three sections with each facing a different angle. The concrete and granite façade featured large windows on the third through tenth floors and ornamental details including 7 feet (2.1 m) sculptures flanking the main entrance depicting winged wheels below a 1926 automobile with 1926 license plates, stone bas-reliefs on the second floor depicting headlights and radiator grilles, and lion-headed grotesques below the roof line. The sides and rear of the building, which included ten floors, including a two-level basement and 20 parking levels, were mostly lined with large windows. The total frontage on New York Avenue was 160 feet (49 m), and the building was 213 feet (65 m) wide.

The interior space measured 6 acres (2.4 ha) which included parking spaces for 1,200 automobiles, a number which would have been surpassed by Frank Lloyd Wright's Crystal Heights complex near Dupont Circle had Lloyd's design been built. In addition to operating as a parking garage, the building included an Amoco gas station, automobile repair shop, carwash, and retail space including a cigar store. There were 20 ramps inside the garage, measuring 16 feet (4.9 m) wide, with separate ramps for automobiles driving either up or down the structure. The incline of the ramps was compared to driving north on 16th Street NW in the area of Meridian Hill Park.

=== Operations ===
To promote the opening of the Capital Garage, owners organized a contest whereby car dealerships would have someone drive their automobiles to the top of the building, with the fastest time winning the race. The contest was held on March 12, 1927, with hundreds of spectators. A reporter for The Washington Post wrote, "The purpose of the contest, officials of the garage said, was two-fold: to allow the dealers to come to the garage and demonstrate the climbing power of their cars, and to introduce to the public the facilities of the new garage." The winning driver, King Richardson, completed the task in 1 minute and 29 seconds in a new Studebaker. He beat E.N. Wallace, who drove a Peerless Model 6-90, by five seconds. The Post reported, "The contest of course convinced none of the participants as to which car could climb the best. It was claimed that it was in large measure the ability of the driver and not the car, which decided the winner."

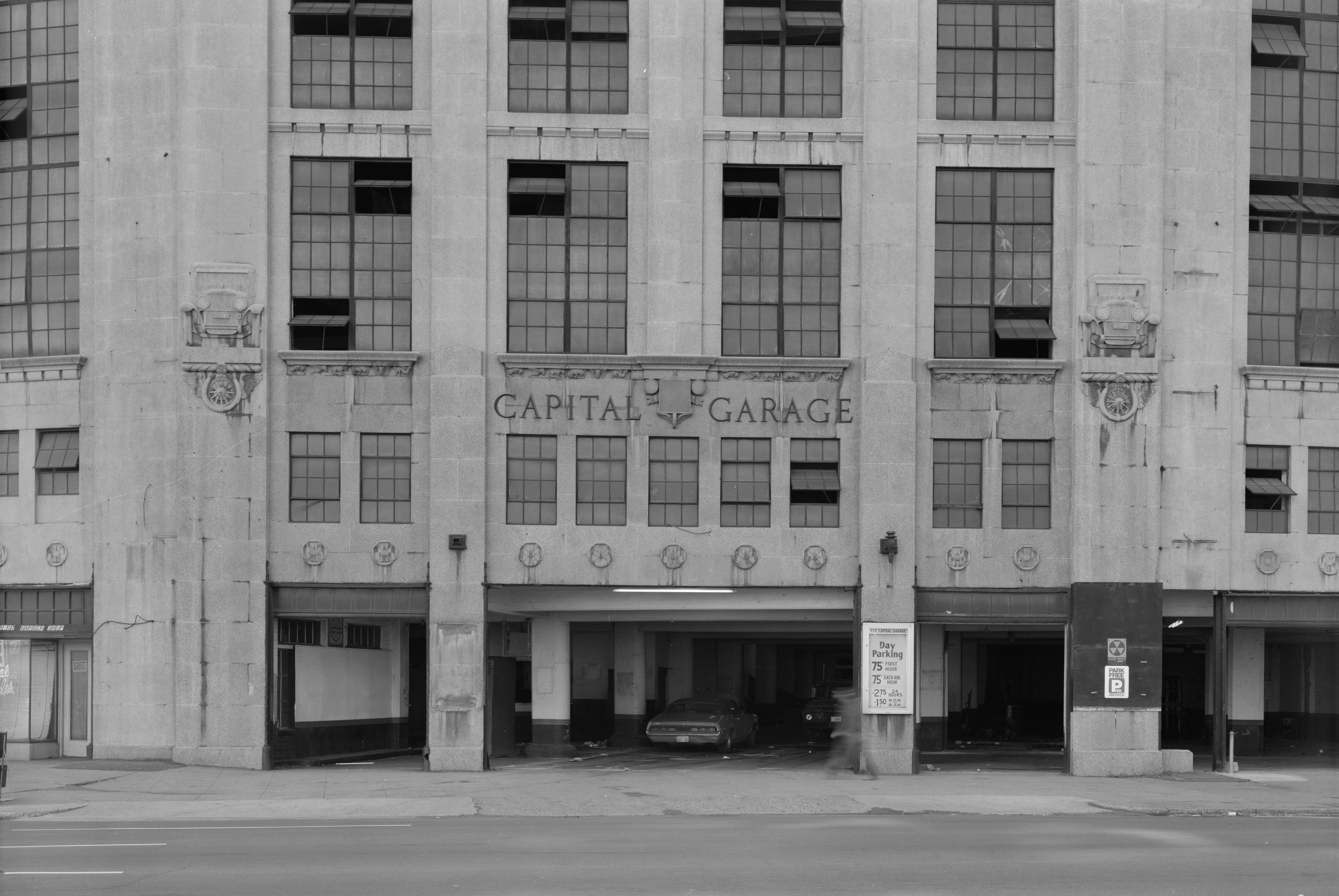
Ornamental details above the entrance

When the Capital Garage opened in March 1927, customers could pay 25 cents to park for the first two hours or $5 weekly. The garage proved popular with area businesses including the Woodward & Lothrop and Palais Royal department stores, who would often entice customers by paying their parking costs or offering valet services. By the 1930s around 75 people were employed at the Capital Garage. For three years during World War II General Philip Bracken Fleming authorized the federal government leasing the building for $500,000, which was later criticized by former Interior Secretary Harold L. Ickes. The garage was used to house government vehicles as well as storage space for documents.

After the war, the Capital Garage was remodeled, and in 1947 a Nash Motors dealership opened in the building. Two years later a fundraiser for the Metropolitan Police Boys' Club was held at the garage. The fundraiser involved a black 1941 Mercedes-Benz 770 limousine described as "Hitler's Car" being put on display. Hitler had only ridden in the car twice, and it was given as a gift to Finnish Field Marshal Carl Gustaf Emil Mannerheim after Finland became allies with Nazi Germany.

In the 1950s the Nash dealership was replaced by Chrysler and a secondary parking lot was added at 1714 F Street NW. As the size of automobiles increased from the 1940s to 1960s, the parking spots in the Capital Garage were often too small for the wide-bodied vehicles. Journalist Charles McDowell Jr. wrote about the struggles of parking in the garage, calling it an "adventure every work day." For a reduced rate, customers could park their own vehicles, which McDowell described as "squeezing past the monsters so swollen through the years." A parking space once suitable for a Packard no longer sufficed for modern vehicles, which would sometimes take up two-and-a-half spaces. He also described the once-grand lobby where valet drivers would wait for customers and reminisce about the garage's "glory days," when the building was always busy; employees could tell the social status of customers by the level on which their car was parked. Notable people who once used the facility include Jacqueline Kennedy Onassis and Shirley Temple.

=== Closing and demolition ===
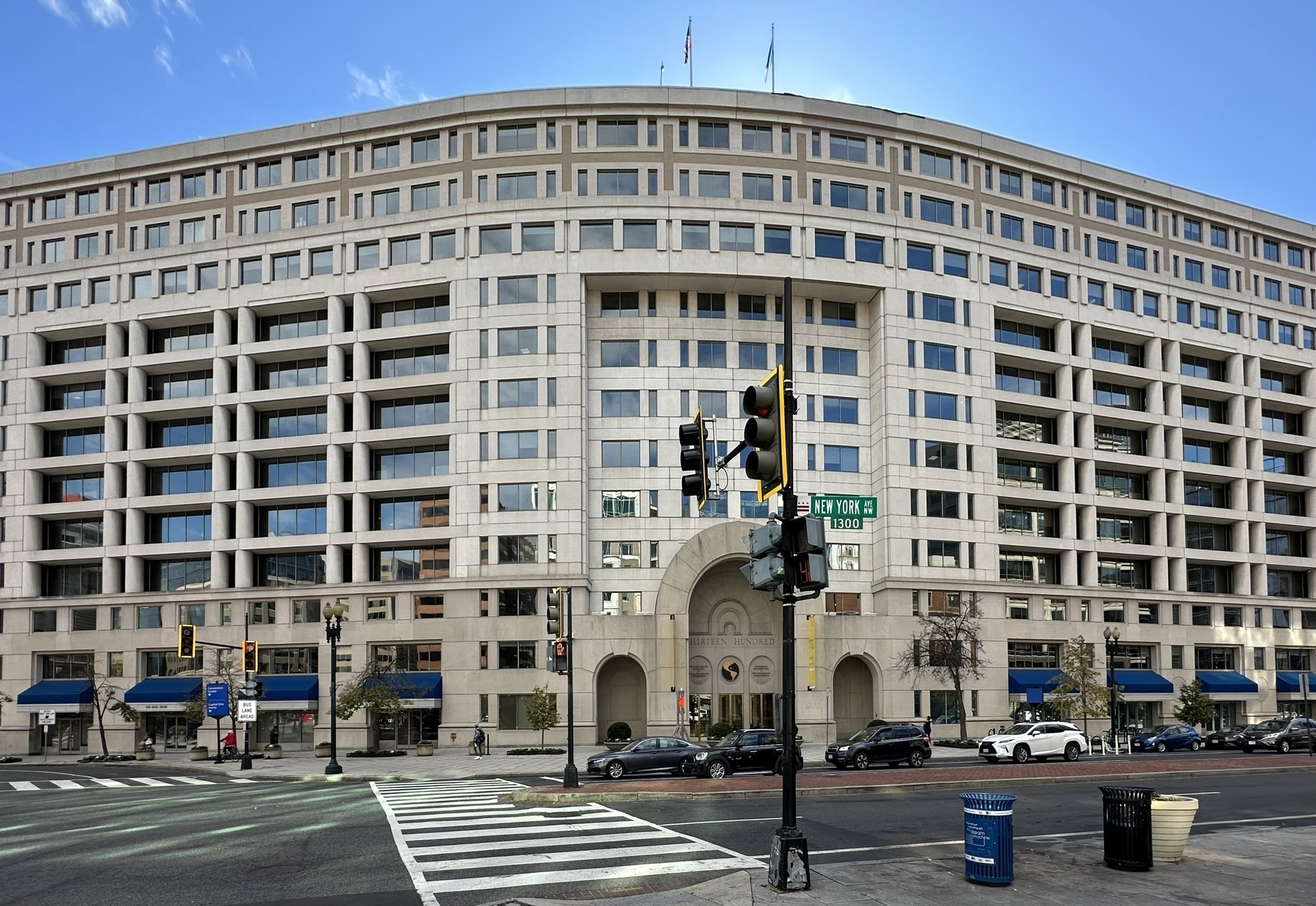
The Capital Garage site is now an office building housing the Inter-American Development Bank headquarters.

As the building grew older and parking became more difficult in the garage, business declined, and the Capital Garage closed in November 1973. The building that The Book of Washington once called a "splendid institution" and a "distinct contribution to the beauties of Washington" was demolished by car parking company PMI two months later. On January 5, 1974, 600 pounds (272 kg) of dynamite was used to implode the Capital Garage with the front wall falling last. There was reportedly no damage to any surrounding buildings. There would not be another implosion in the city until 2004 when the Washington Convention Center was demolished.

Because the front wall of the Capital Garage was largely intact after the implosion, some of the architectural features that adorned the façade were saved. The bas-reliefs that were recovered, which Robert M. Vogel of the Smithsonian Institution said survived "quite well" and "the only break was in one tire, just chips," were donated to the Smithsonian's National Museum of American History. The Smithsonian notes "only the iconic sculptures remain to mark the pomp and grandeur that helped to usher in the automobile age in Washington." Both McDowell and author James M. Goode, a Smithsonian Institution historian, suggested the Capital Garage would have likely been saved if it had survived a few more years due to the increased popularity of historic preservationism.

The garage's site remained undeveloped until 1981, when the Daon Development Corporation paid $615 a square foot, a record price in the city, for the New York Avenue property. The Daon Building, designed by architect David Childs, was constructed on the site three years later. The 720,000 square-foot (66,890 sq m) office building is twice the size of the Capital Garage and houses the Inter-American Development Bank.
