= Warren Clark =

Warren Clark may refer to:

- Warren Clark Jr. (1936–2018), American diplomat
- E. Warren Clark (1849–1907), American educator

== See also ==
- Warren Clarke (1947–2014), English actor
