= Park & Shop =

Park & Shop or "Park and Shop" or "Park 'n' Shop" may mean:

- a small neighborhood shopping center (strip mall) with parking for motor vehicles in front, a term used when such centers first appeared in the mid-1920s, or
  - Park & Shop (Cleveland Park, Washington, D.C.), opened 1930, one such center
- one of a number of supermarkets named "Park and Shop" such as:
  - Canale's Park & Shop in Memphis, Tennessee, U.S., opened 1924
- a services for motorists in the downtown districts of numerous cities, whereby they could park their vehicle free of charge or for a low price off-street and shop at any or several of multiple participating nearby merchants
