= Retail park =

Unenclosed shopping area

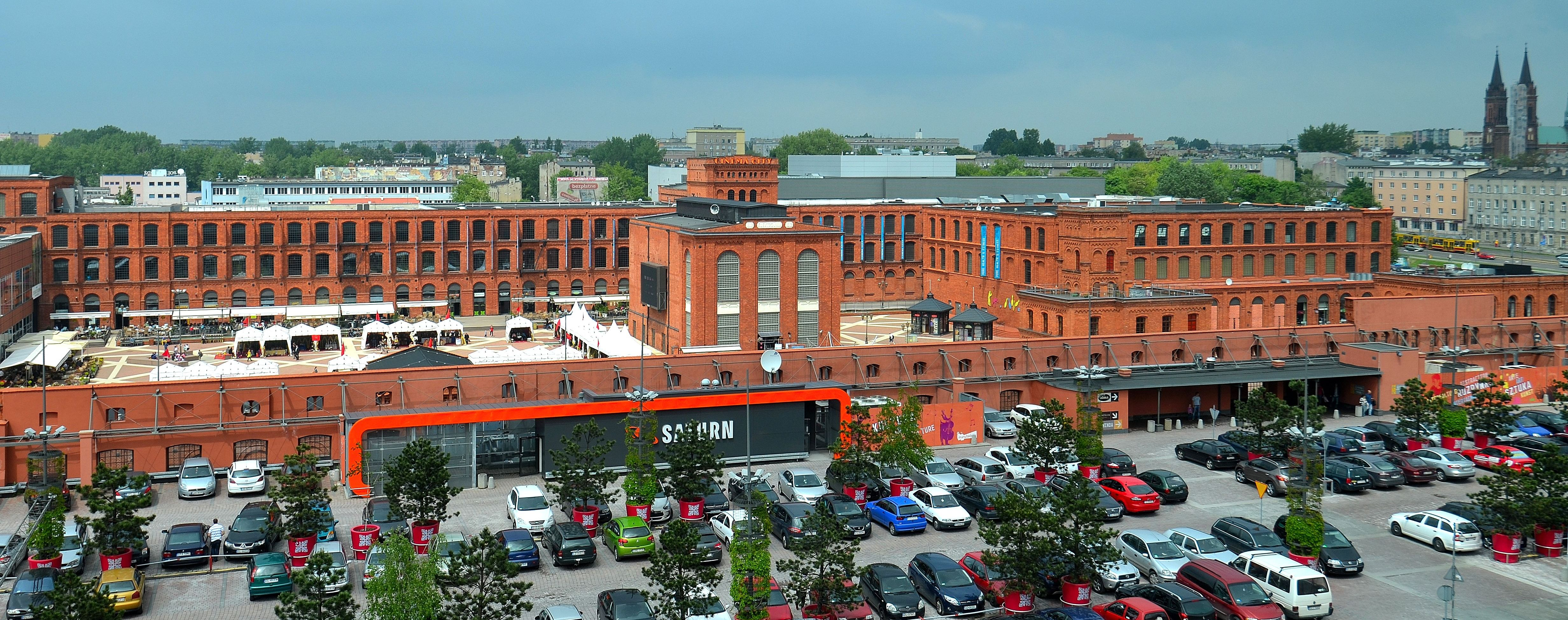
Manufaktura, a retail park and lifestyle centre in Łódź, Poland

A retail park is a type of shopping centre found on the fringes of most large towns and cities in the United Kingdom and other European countries. Retail parks form a key aspect of European retail geographies, alongside indoor shopping centres, standalone stores like hypermarkets and more traditional high streets. They are a similar retail model to the North American power centers, neighborhood shopping centers and strip malls.

Cushman & Wakefield define a retail park as any shopping centre with mostly retail warehouse units, of a size 5,000 square metres (54,000 sq ft) or larger.

Retail parks have a number of retailers in a single location, but as opposed to an indoor centre, there is no roof, and they are therefore not weatherproof.

== History ==
Retail parks originate in out-of-town retail locations containing big box retailers which are not suited to pedestrianised high streets, such as garden centres, home stores and supermarkets.

More recently, many high street retailers have moved to retail parks, since retail parks offer cheaper rents and cheaper parking for customers. For example, in the UK, Marks and Spencer and Next have closed or downsized many high streets stores and moved them to retail parks.

== Geography ==
Retail parks generally are located in highly accessible locations and are aimed at households owning a car, though there are often also bus services. They are an alternative to city centre shopping districts. Such developments have been encouraged by cheaper, more affordable land on the outskirts of towns and cities, and with loose planning controls in a number of enterprise zones, making planning and development significantly easier. There are over 1,500 retail parks across the UK. In 2026 they occupied about 407 million square feet (37.8 million square metres). The largest park, about 676,000 square feet (62,800 m^{2}), is Middlebrook Retail & Leisure Park in Horwich, Bolton.

Retail parks normally have large car parks (parking lots) and are not designed for people to browse, but instead for more direct shopping trips. This has meant retail parks have faced economic competition from Internet retail, since they have not historically offered the same experience factor as town centre retail. Vacancy rates in shopping centres in the UK are almost twice those of retail parks.

Town planning policies which favour retail park development pose a threat to high streets as customers are deterred from high street stores. However, most retail parks are the result of lack of planning rather than pro-car policies; car-centric urban planning such as retail parks are 'the unwitting result of a set of planning rules'.

== Environment ==
Opponents of retail parks argue that retail parks 'do not make sense' because of the ongoing climate crisis. However, retail parks are likely to benefit from climate change. An article in Nature found that, due to anthropogenic climate change, catastrophic rain and floods will happen more frequently and with greater severity. During periods of heavy rain, retail parks in the UK see an increase in customer footfall.

== Typical tenants ==
Typically, retail parks host a range of chain stores, including furniture, clothes or footwear superstores, electrical stores, carpet and others – and the anchor tenant is usually a supermarket. Owing to their out-of-town sites, abundance of free parking and proximity to major roads, retail parks are often easier to reach by car than central shopping areas, and as a result, town centres are less attractive to retailers.

== Prevalence outside the UK ==
=== Continental Europe ===
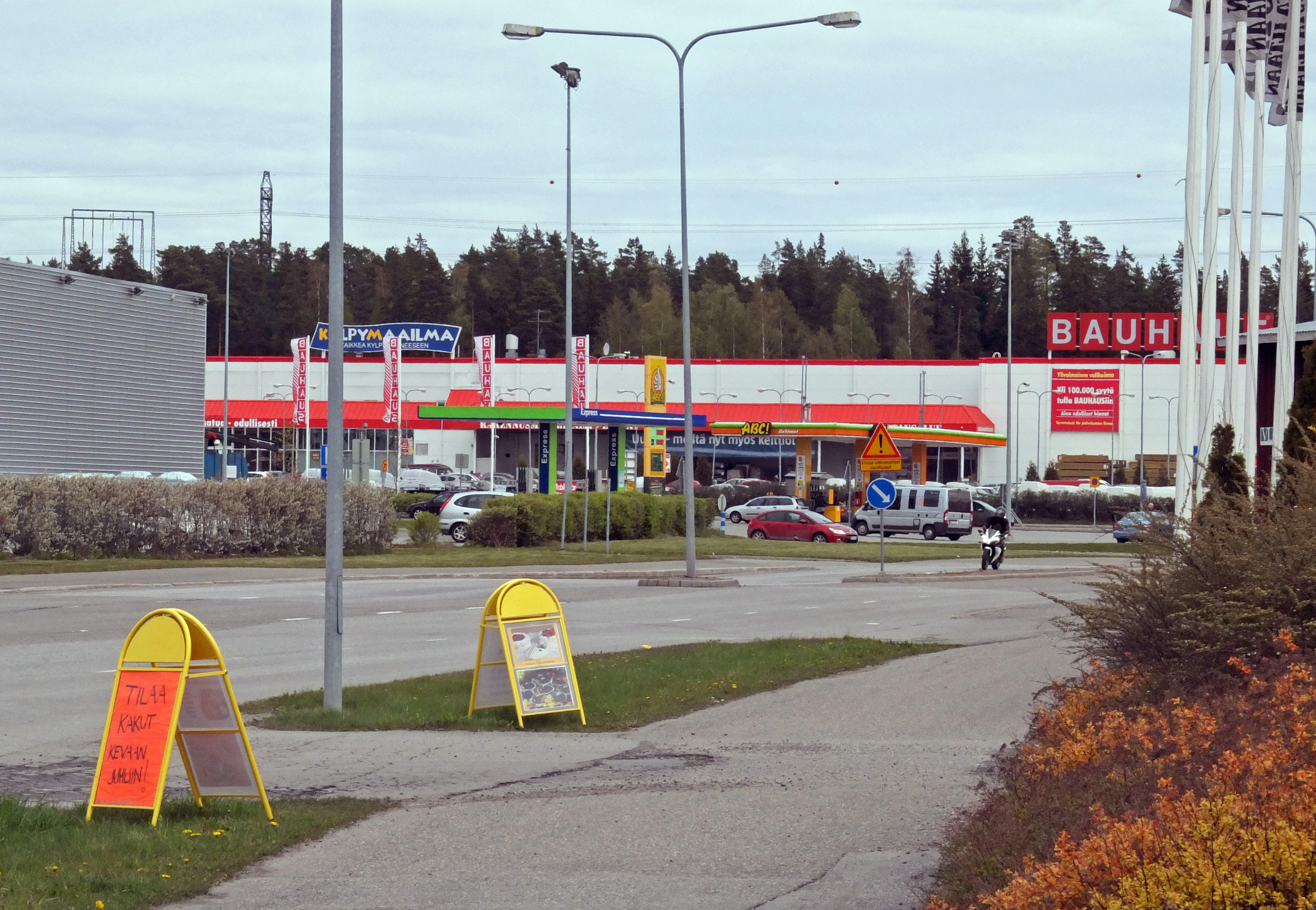
Large retail park with outlets of Kuloinen, Raisio, Finland

Retail parks have been growing in Continental Europe: according to Cushman & Wakefield, who defines a retail park as an open-air centre with more than 5,000 sq. m. of retail space, total retail space in retail parks in Europe was predicted to be around 40 million sq. m. at the end of 2017. The amount of floor space in retail parks increased by 836,000 square meters in 2015, and 1.3 million square metres in 2016. France accounted for 54% of the new retail space in Western Europe, followed by Britain at 17% and Italy at 10%. At 70,000 sq. m., the "Steel" retail park in Saint-Étienne, France was cited as the largest planned project at that time.

=== North America ===
In the U.S., "retail park" is neither the common nor industry term. A shopping centre that in Europe is considered a retail park might fall into one of several categories in North American industry terms:

- Power centers: Even larger centers of 250,000 to 600,000 square feet (23,000 to 56,000 m^{2}) are considered power centers, typically anchored by category-killer big box stores (e.g. Best Buy) incl. discount department stores (e.g. Target) and wholesale clubs (e.g. Costco). According to a 2003 book on retail property locations, the American power center technically does not exist anywhere in the United Kingdom, but "the nearest British equivalent to the power centre is the large retail park."
- Community centers: Slightly larger centers 125,000 to 400,000 square feet (11,600 to 37,200 m^{2}) with general merchandise or convenience-oriented offerings are termed as community centers or large neighborhood centers by the ICSC (International Council of Shopping Centers), who state that they typically have a "wider range of apparel and other soft goods offerings than neighborhood centers. The center is usually configured in a straight line as a strip, or may be laid out in an L or U shape, depending on the site and design."
- Strip malls: Open-air centers under 30,000 square feet (2,800 m^{2}) are generally considered strip malls.

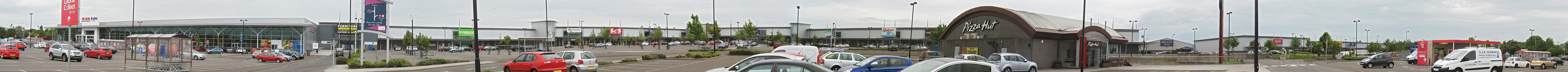
Kingsway West Retail Park in Dundee, Scotland – a typical layout with an anchor store (here a Tesco hypermarket) and large-format retailers, surrounding customer parking and traffic access

== See also ==
- Big-box store (known as a "retail warehouse unit" in the industry in the U.K. and Europe)
- Power center (retail) (North America)
- Neighborhood shopping center (North America)
- Lifestyle center
- Festival marketplace
- Strip mall
- Types of retail outlets
