= John Eaton Elementary School =

Coordinates: 38.932686°N 77.065556°W

- Students at John Eaton Elementary School, 1910s
- Washington, DC

Information
- Website: http://www.eatondc.org/

John Eaton Elementary School is an elementary school in the Cleveland Park neighborhood of Washington, DC. It is part of the District of Columbia Public School system.

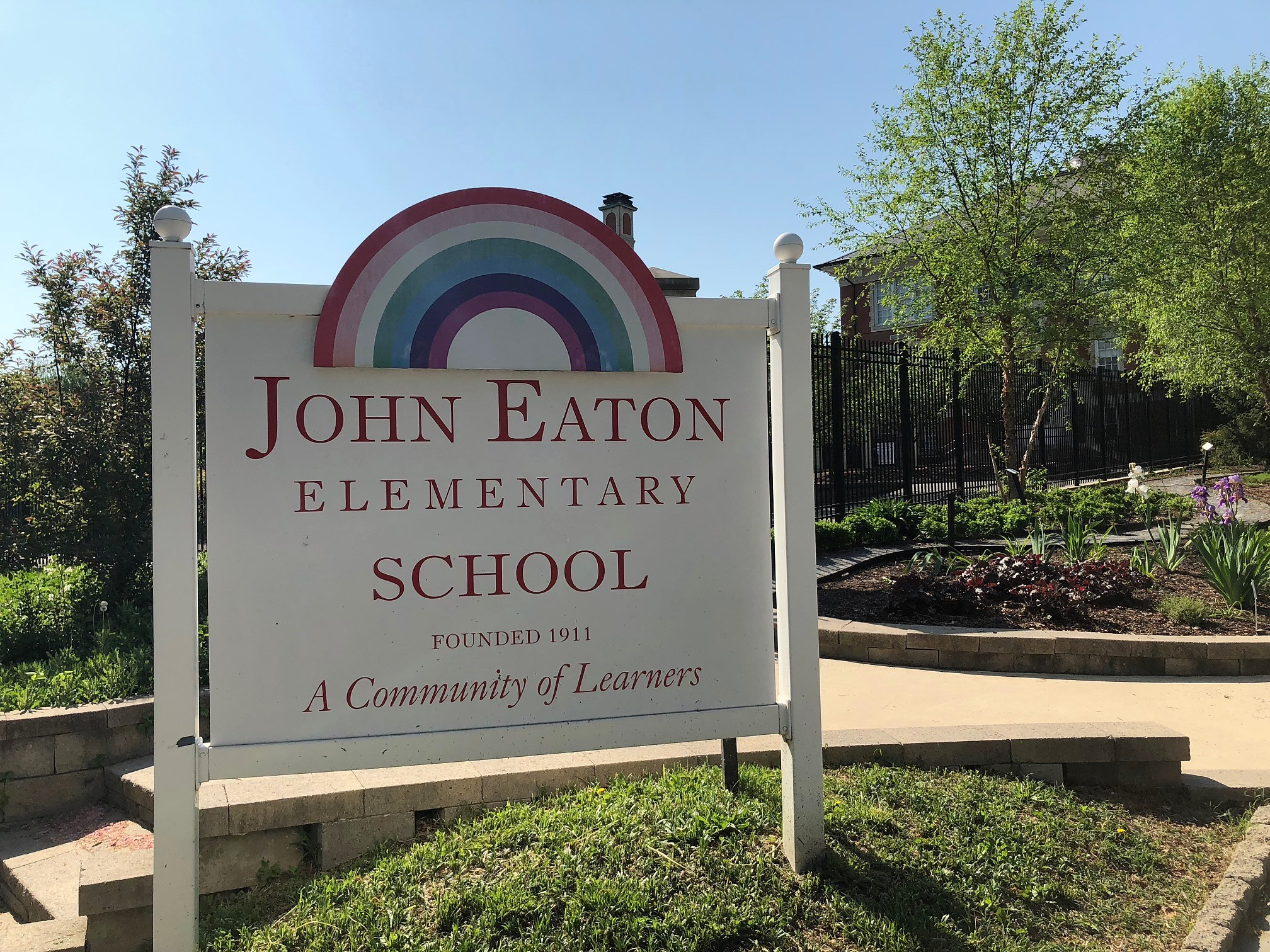
Sign in front of John Eaton Elementary School in Washington, D.C.

It opened as John Eaton Public School # 160 at 3301 Lowell Street NW on October 24, 1910. The interior followed the standard Adolf Cluss design long used by DC public schools, and the exterior of red brick and yellow brick trim was designed by architect Appleton P. Clark, Jr. It was named for recently deceased General John Eaton, a Union Army veteran who founded some 74 schools for freedmen and was later a college president. Within less than a decade, the school was overcrowded, prompting the construction of an addition in 1922 designed by Arthur B. Heaton. An auditorium/gymnasium was added in 1930.

The Cleveland Park branch of the District of Columbia Public Library began as a single room in the Eaton School in 1910. Library services remained there, interrupted by World War I and II, until the construction of a library that opened in 1953.

The school was one of 18 DC schools selected for integration following Brown v Board of Education, beginning with 10 African-American students in the fall of 1954.
