= Brainard Warner =

American businessman and developer (1847–1916)

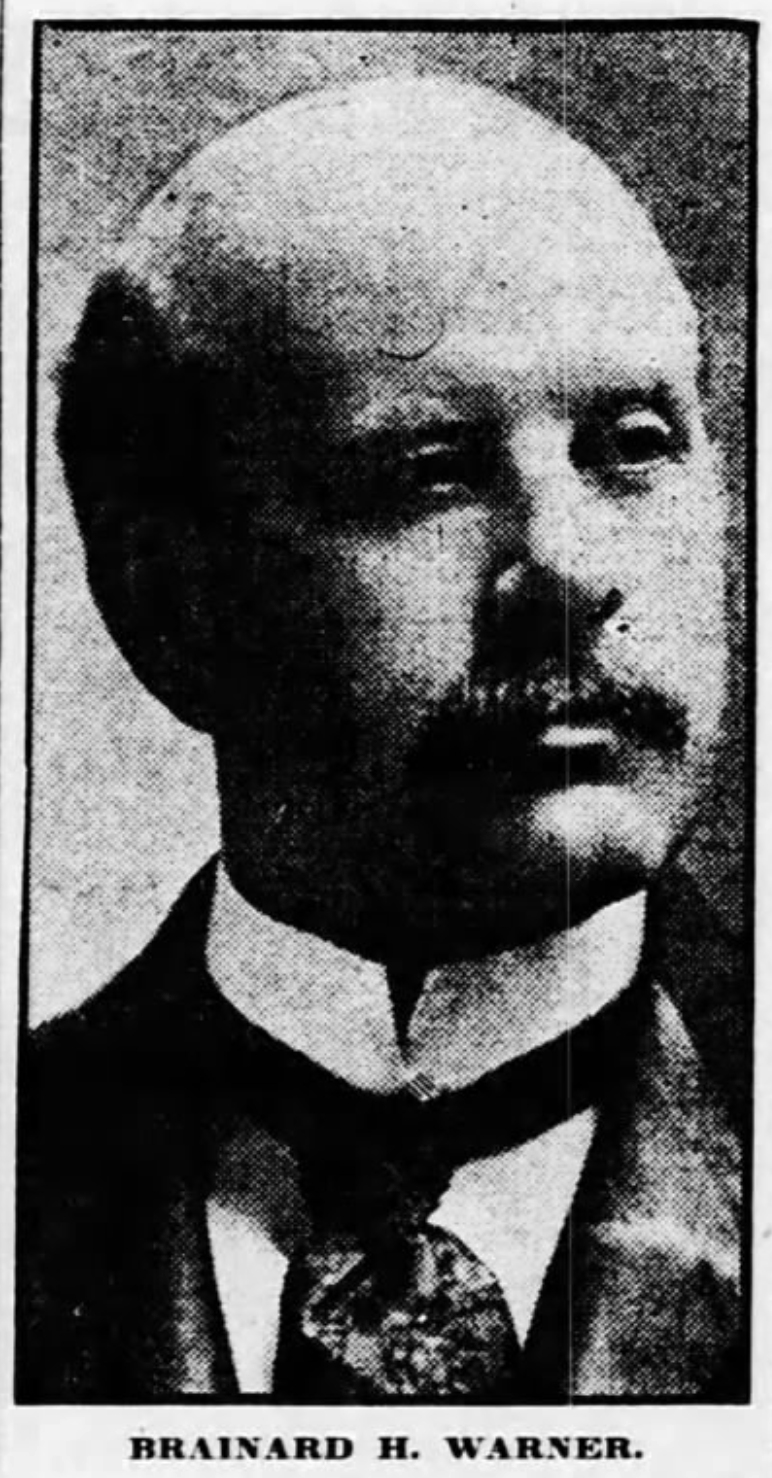
Headshot of Brainard H. Warner, banker and businessman, printed with his 1916 obituary

Brainard Warner (May 20, 1847 – May 17, 1916) was a prominent businessman and land developer in the Washington, D.C., area, best known for founding Kensington, Maryland.

Warner was born on May 20, 1847, in Susquehanna County, Pennsylvania. In 1863, he went to Washington and enlisted in the United States Army. He served as a government clerk in 1866, studied law under Thaddeus Stevens, and traveled around the American West as a newspaper correspondent. In 1869, he graduated from Columbian College Law School in Washington.

Warner entered the real estate business; he would ultimately build more than 1,000 houses in Washington. In 1878, the offices of his firm, the B.H. Warner Company, were at 916 F Street NW.

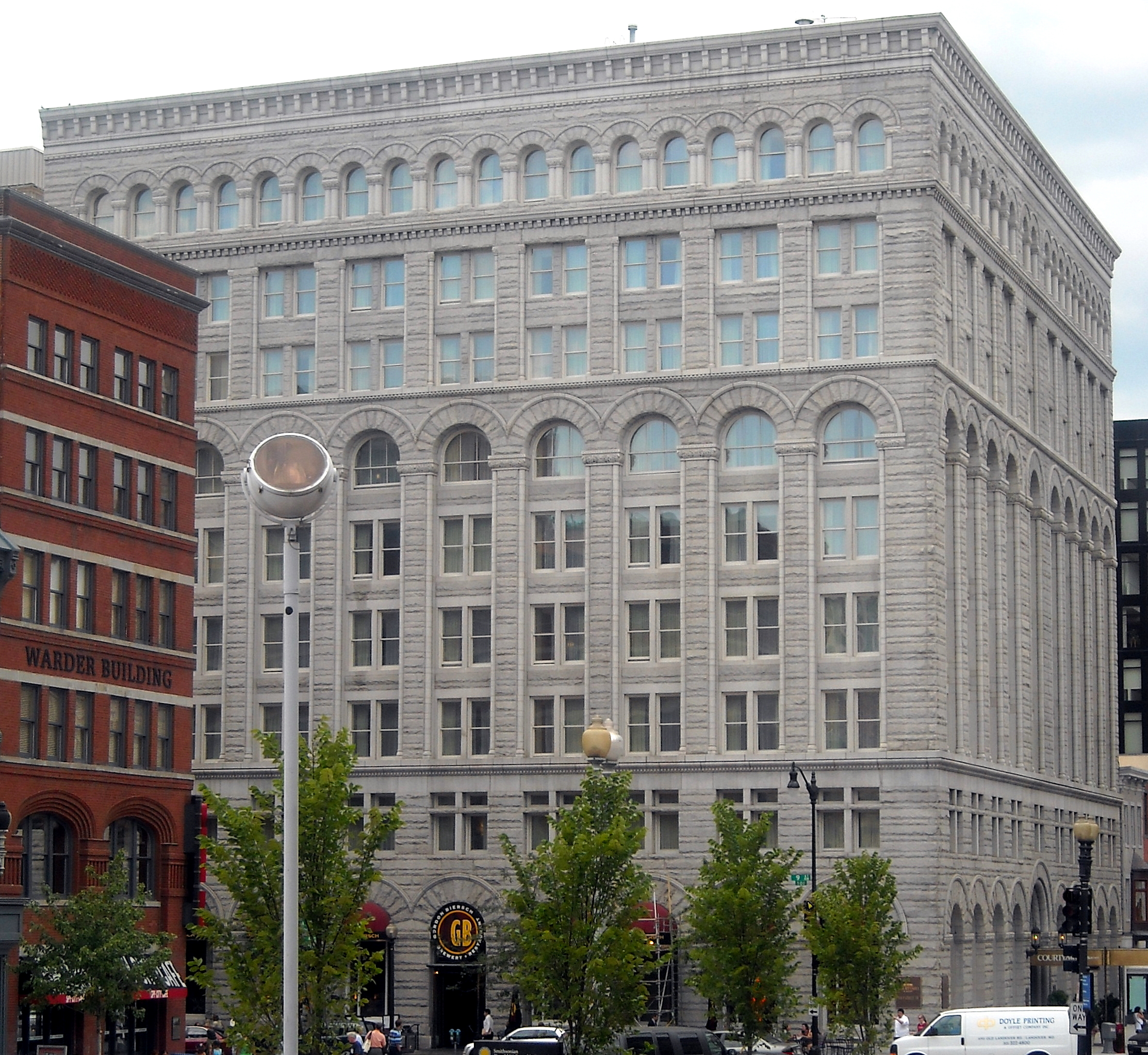
Washington Loan and Trust Company building in 2008

In 1887, he established the Columbia National Bank at 911 F Street NW; it would operate independently until 1946 and is today part of Bank of America. In 1889, he founded Washington Loan and Trust Company at 900 F Street NW; it was acquired by Riggs Bank in 1954 and is now part of PNC Financial Services. He was also a director of numerous other banks.

As Warner's interest turned to banking, he relinquished daily control of his real estate company, which continued to prosper. In 1907, the Washington Post would describe it as possibly the largest real-estate brokerage in the city.

Kensington Plat (c. 1890)

In 1890, Warner bought 132 acres of farmland south of Knowles Station, a village along the Baltimore and Ohio Railroad's Metropolitan Branch line in Montgomery County, Maryland. He subdivided it and sold lots along curving streets, aiming to create a suburb to evoke the district around Kensington Gardens in London. The B&O soon built a station to serve the developing area.

In 1892, he built a Victorian mansion on the 4.5-acre oval at the heart of his subdivision as a retreat for his family from Washington. He entertained grandly, hosting congressmen, senators, and once, President William Howard Taft. In 1910, his daughter Mary would wed in the house.

In the early 1890s, he helped start the Belt Line Railroad in Baltimore, Maryland. In 1894, Warner and others chartered the Chevy Chase Lake & Kensington Railway, a three-mile streetcar line, to connect the newly incorporated town of Kensington to downtown Washington, D.C., some eight miles south, via the Rock Creek Railway streetcar line.

Around 1900, Warner was serving as vice president of the Washington Public Library board of trustees when he "seized on a chance meeting with Andrew Carnegie" to ask him to fund public libraries in the city. Carnegie ultimately funded four, starting with the central library at Mount Vernon Square. Opened in 1903, the library was the city's first desegregated public building.

In 1906, Warner ran unsuccessfully to represent Maryland in the House of Representatives.

Warner died in his home at 10 East Kirke Street in Chevy Chase, Maryland, on May 17, 1916, several days after being stricken with paralysis. He was buried at Oak Hill Cemetery in Washington, D.C.
