= Arthur B. Heaton =

American architect (1875–1951)

- Born: November 12, 1875; Washington, D.C.
- Died: December 6, 1951
- Occupation: Architect

Arthur B. Heaton (November 12, 1875–December 6, 1951) was an American architect from Washington, D.C. During his 50-year career Heaton designed over 1,000 commissions, including many notable buildings listed on the National Register of Historic Places (NRHP). He was the first supervising architect of the Washington National Cathedral and one of several local architects responsible for designing many of the buildings in the Burleith, Cleveland Park, Kalorama Triangle, and Woodley Park neighborhoods.

== Early life ==
Arthur Berthrong Heaton was born on November 12, 1875, in Washington, D.C., to Frank and Mabel (née Berthrong) Heaton. After graduating from Central High School in 1892, Heaton apprenticed for architectural firms owned by Marsh and Peter (William J. Marsh and Walter G. Peter), Paul J. Pelz, and Frederick B. Pyle. He later traveled to Europe and visited grand buildings while studying at the University of Paris. In 1897, following his return to Washington, D.C., Heaton and architect George A. Dessez designed 1712–1720 22nd Street NW in Sheridan-Kalorama and two homes on Decatur Street NW. The following year he opened his own architectural office.

== Career ==
Heaton's practice was very successful and within a few years he had already designed four apartment buildings, including The Augusta and The Highlands (now the Churchill Hotel). He would eventually design 28 apartment buildings between 1900 and 1940. The Altamont, located at 1901 Wyoming Avenue NW, is one of Heaton's prominent apartment designs and a contributing property to the Kalorama Triangle Historic District. Most of the residential buildings he designed were private residences. Heaton is one of the local architects who was responsible for designing many of the homes during Woodley Park's housing boom from 1905–1929. He was one of the prominent architects who designed buildings in Kalorama Triangle during that neighborhood's development, and from 1917 to 1932, he provided plans for hundreds of homes in the Burleith neighborhood for the Shannon and Luchs development company. Heaton designed homes for many of Washington's prominent citizens, including Gilbert Hovey Grosvenor, the first president of the National Geographic Society, and the widow of Representative Joseph W. Babcock, whose house now serves as the Embassy of Cape Verde.

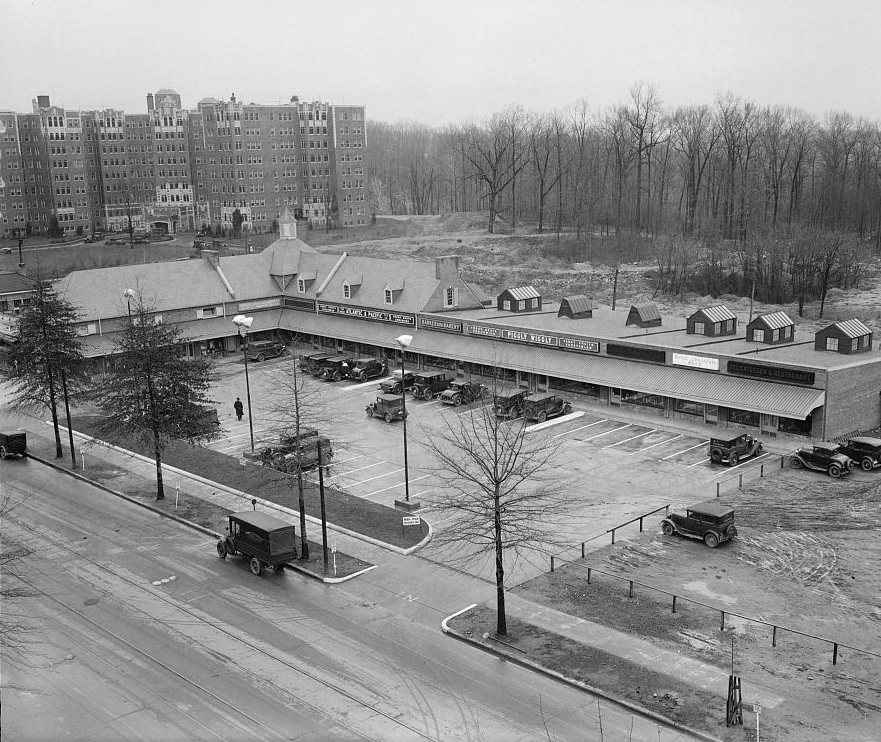
The Park & Shop in Cleveland Park, Washington, D.C. (1930) is one of the earliest examples of a small center with dedicated on-site parking in front.

His work was not limited to residential architecture. From 1908 to 1928, Heaton served as the supervising architect on the construction of the Washington National Cathedral. Educational buildings designed by Heaton include Corcoran Hall and Stockton Hall (both with architect Albert L. Harris) on the campus of George Washington University and Bunker Hill Elementary School (now called the Brookland Education Campus @ Bunker Hill). His surviving commercial designs include the Equitable Bank Building (with architect Frederick B. Pyle), the National Geographic Society's Administration Building, the Riggs National Bank, Washington Loan and Trust Company Branch (1927 addition; now a Courtyard by Marriott hotel), the John Dickson Home for Aged Men (now the Kingsbury Center), and the Park & Shop, believed to be the country's first planned neighborhood shopping center. His demolished commercial designs include the Capital Garage, built in 1927 and imploded in 1974.

He was a member of the American Institute of Architects from 1901 until his death and named a Fellow of the American Institute of Architects in 1941. Following Heaton's death on December 6, 1951, one of his colleagues, Leon Chatelain III, donated almost 10,000 of Heaton's drawings and designs to the Library of Congress.

== Personal life ==
Heaton and Mabel Williams were married on October 1, 1902, at St. Andrews Episcopal Church (now the John Wesley A.M.E. Zion Church) at 14th and Corcoran Streets NW in Logan Circle. The couple had two children, Doris (b. 1906), and James (b. 1911). The family originally lived at 3320 Highland Avenue NW in Cleveland Park, but moved to 4861 Indian Lane NW in Spring Valley, designed by Heaton, in 1928.
