= Strip mall =

Open-air shopping mall

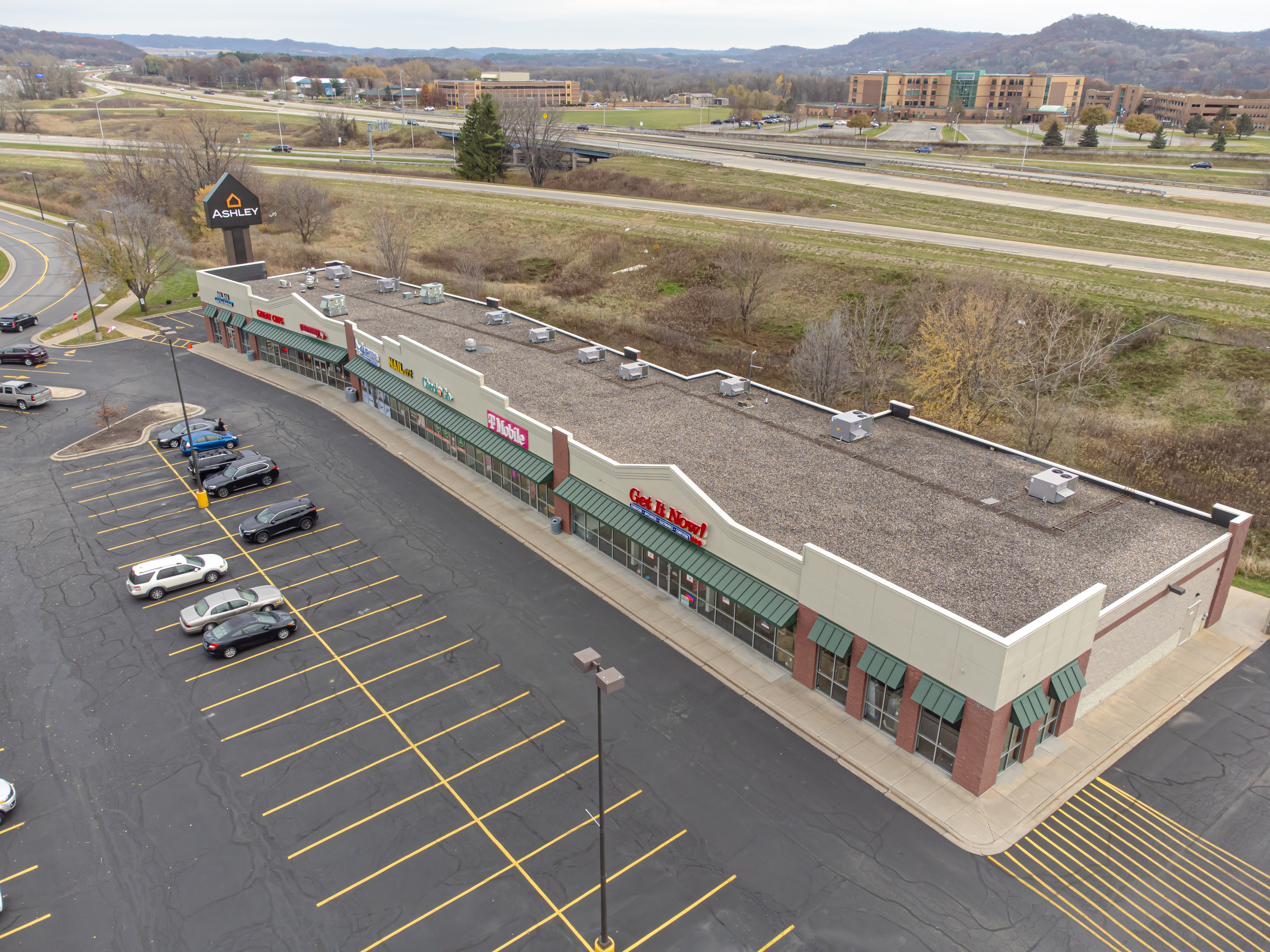
An example of a small strip mall in Onalaska, Wisconsin

A strip mall (also known as strip center, strip plaza, shopping village, shopping plaza, or simply plaza) is a type of shopping center common in the United States, Canada, and Australia where the stores are arranged in a row, with a footpath in front. Strip malls are typically developed as a unit and have large parking lots in front. Many of them face major traffic arterials and tend to be self-contained, with few pedestrian connections to surrounding neighborhoods.

Smaller strip malls may be called mini-malls, while larger ones may be called power centers or big box centers. In 2013, The New York Times reported that the United States had 65,840 strip malls. In 2020, The Wall Street Journal wrote that in the United States, despite the continuing retail apocalypse that started in around 2010, investments and visitor numbers were increasing to strip malls. By 2024, the number of strip malls in the United States had grown to more than 68,000.

In the United Kingdom and Ireland, such malls are called retail parks or retail outlets. They are usually located on the outskirts of towns and cities, and serve as an alternative to the high street in the UK or main street in Ireland. Retail parks have become popular due to the widespread use of cars and the ability to park close to the shops as opposed to restricted parking on high streets, many of which are pedestrianised.

In Australia, "strip shops" or "shopping centre" describes a line of independent shops along the principal streets of a city or suburban area, which are not set back from the pavement (footpath) and do not have dedicated car parking spaces.

== Classification ==
Strip malls and retail parks often range in size from 5,000 square feet (460 m^{2}) to over 100,000 square feet (9,300 m^{2}).

In the International Council of Shopping Centers' (ICSC) classification of shopping centers, United States and Canadian strip malls may fit the definition of:

- Neighborhood shopping center (30,000 to 125,000 square feet (2,800 to 11,600 m^{2}))
- Power centers which may reach 2.3 million square feet (210,000 m^{2}).
- Other categories, depending on the size and characteristics

Note that ICSC classifications vary slightly for Europe as well as for Asia Pacific.

== History ==
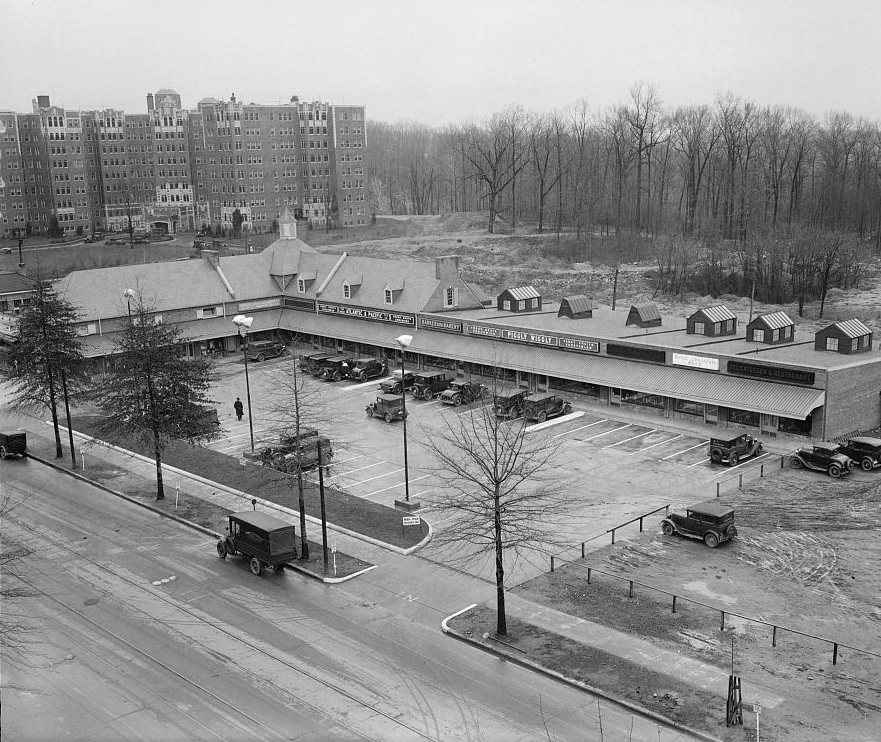
The Park & Shop in Cleveland Park, Washington, D.C. (1930) is one of the earliest examples of a small center with dedicated on-site parking in front.

The Park and Shop in Cleveland Park, Washington, D.C. opened in 1930, anchored by a Piggly Wiggly supermarket. It was built in an L shape with dedicated parking space for shoppers in the front, a novelty at the time. The center still exists as of 2020, anchored by a Target store and measuring 50,400 square feet (4,680 m^{2}).

== Types ==
=== Mini-mall/strip plaza ===
The smaller variety is more common and often located at the intersection of major streets in residential areas; it caters to a small residential area. This type of strip mall or plaza is found in nearly every city or town in the United States and Canada; it is service-oriented and may contain a grocery store, hair salon, dry cleaner, laundromat, small restaurant, discount stores, variety stores, and similar stores such as a general store, toy store, pet store, jewelry store, mattress store, convenience store, thrift shop, or pawn shop. In the past, pharmacies were often located next to the grocery stores, but are now often free-standing or contained within the anchor tenant (e.g. Walmart, Target) or grocery store. Gas stations, banks, and other businesses also may have their own free-standing buildings in the parking lot of the strip center.

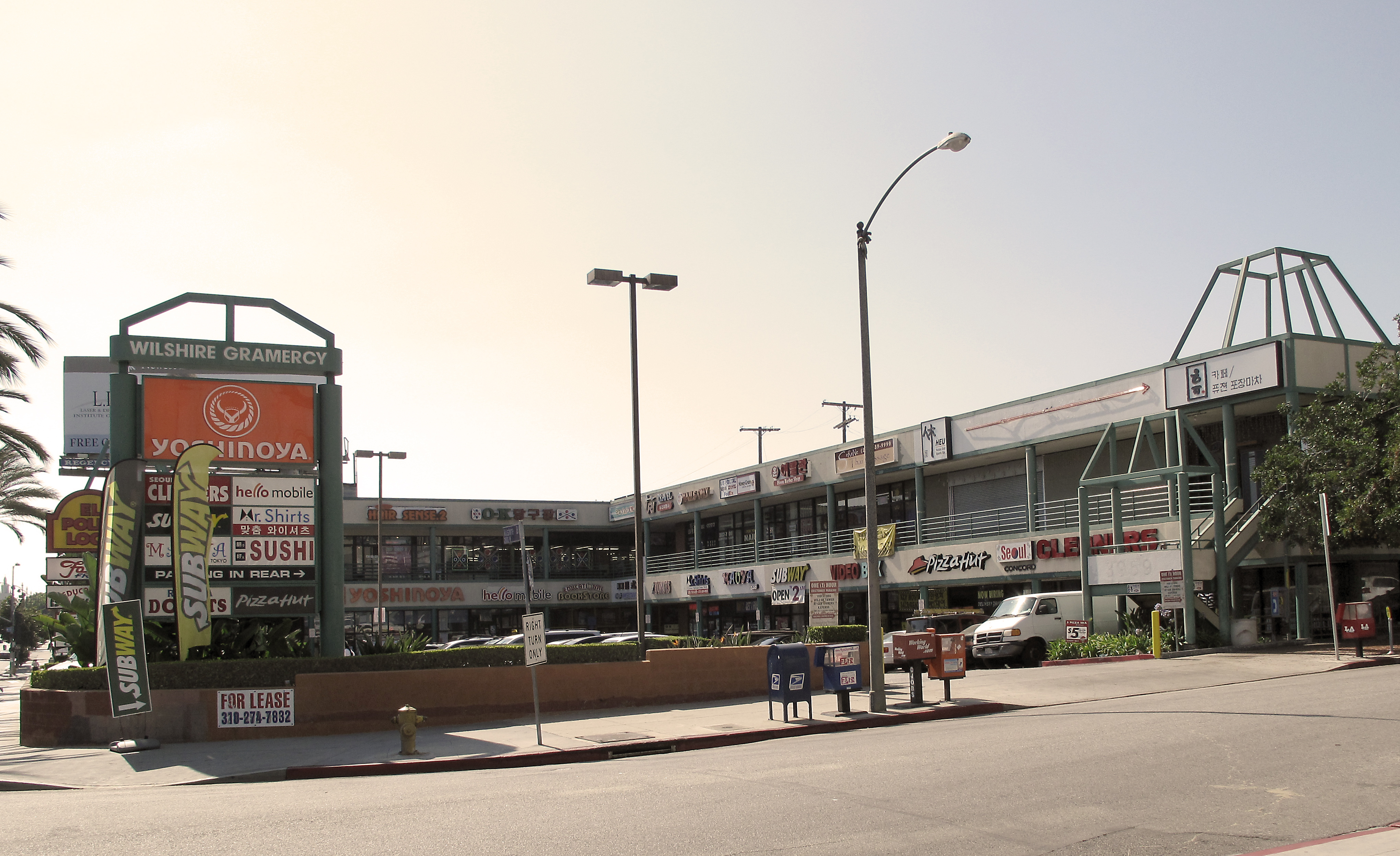
The Wilshire Gramercy Plaza is an example of a mini-mall in Koreatown, Los Angeles, California in 2009

The mini-mall in Los Angeles is seen as the descendant of the drive-in markets with multiple independent vendors that appeared in the area in the 1920s. The 1973 oil crisis bankrupted many gas stations, freeing up their corner lots for redevelopment. La Mancha developers built the first modern-style mini-mall – a few stores with parking in front – in Panorama City, Los Angeles in 1973, with over 600 to follow in the metropolitan area. The proliferation of mini-malls from that time into the 1980s led to a 1988 anti-mini-mall ordinance in Los Angeles.

=== Neighborhood shopping center ===
A neighborhood shopping center (Commonwealth English: neighbourhood shopping centre) is an industry term in the United States for a shopping center with 30,000 to 125,000 square feet (2,800 to 11,600 m^{2}) of gross leasable area, typically anchored by a supermarket and/or large drugstore.

=== Big box center/power center ===
The other variety of strip mall in the United States is usually anchored on one end by a big box retailer, such as Walmart, Kohl's, or Target, and/or by a large supermarket like Kroger, Publix or Winn-Dixie on the other. They are usually referred to as power centers in the real estate development industry because they attract and cater to residents of an expanded population area. The categories of retailers may vary widely, from electronics stores to bookstores to home improvement stores, dollar stores, and boutiques. There are typically only a few of this type of strip malls in a city, compared to the smaller types. Retailers vary from center to center, ranging from three or four large retailers to a dozen or more. Some strip malls are hybrids of these types.

== See also ==
- Types of retail outlets
