= John Joy Edson =

American executive (1846–1935)

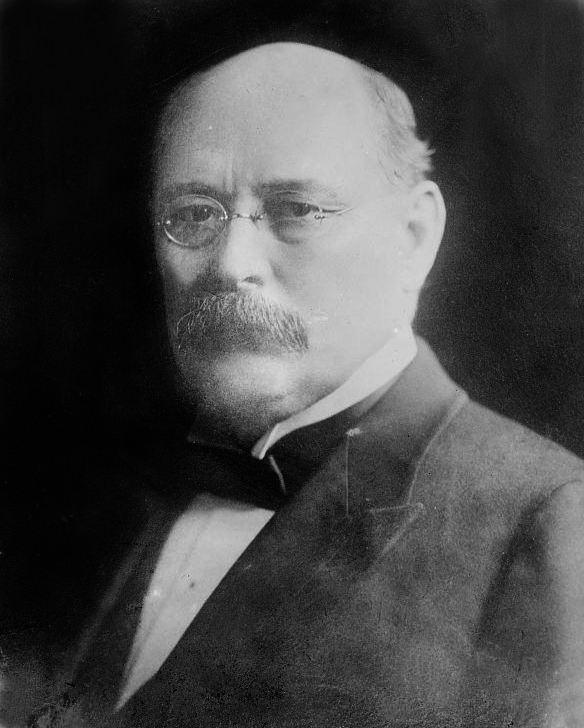
- Born: May 17, 1846; Jefferson, Ohio, U.S.
- Died: July 15, 1935 (aged 89); Washington, D.C., U.S.
- Resting place: Arlington National Cemetery; Arlington, Virginia, U.S.
- Education: Columbia Law School (J.D.)
- Spouse: Elizabeth Berthrong
- Children: 3
- Military career
- Allegiance: United States
- Branch: Union Army
- Unit: 61st New York Volunteers
- Conflicts: American Civil War; Peninsula campaign; Battle of Antietam; Battle of Fredericksburg

John Joy Edson (May 17, 1846 – July 15, 1935), was president of the Washington Loan and Trust Company, Equitable Co-operative Building Association, treasurer of the American Geographical Society, and Chairman of the Board and treasurer of the National Geographic Society.

== Biography ==
John Joy Edson was born on May 17, 1846, in Jefferson, Ohio. He attended public schools in Ohio.

At 14, he enlisted in the 61st New York Volunteers serving in the Civil War in the Virginia and Maryland campaigns. He was a clerk in the office of the Comptroller of the Currency, from 1863 to 1875. He graduated from Columbia Law School in 1868 with a J.D. He practiced patent law from 1875 to 1881 with his brother, Joseph Edson.

In 1879, he organized the Equitable Co-operative Building Association, serving as secretary, and president from 1898 to 1935. He was vice president of the Washington Loan and Trust Company from 1889, serving as president from 1894 to 1917, and chairman of the board from 1917 to 1935. He served on the board of Columbia National Bank, National Metropolitan Bank, and Potomac Fire Insurance Company.

He was president of the Greater Washington Board of Trade from 1901 to 1902, and Washington Bankers Association, and was treasurer of the U.S. Chamber of Commerce from 1912 to 1935. He chaired the Citizens' Executive Committee, for the Grand Army of the Republic in 1892. He was president of the Civil Service Reform Association from 1895 to 1907. He was treasurer of the Associated Charities from 1903 to 1934, and was president of the District government's Board of Charities. He was a delegate to the Pan-American Financial Congress in 1914.

== Personal life ==
Edson was married to Elizabeth Berthrong and had three children: Elizabeth Edson, John Joy Edson Jr. (1871–1921) and another son who died in infancy.

In 1928, he was hit by a car crossing F Street in Washington, D.C. He died on July 15, 1935, at his home in Washington, D.C. He was interred at Arlington National Cemetery in Arlington, Virginia.
