= William L. Slayton House =

Historic house in Washington, D.C., United States

- U.S. National Register of Historic Places
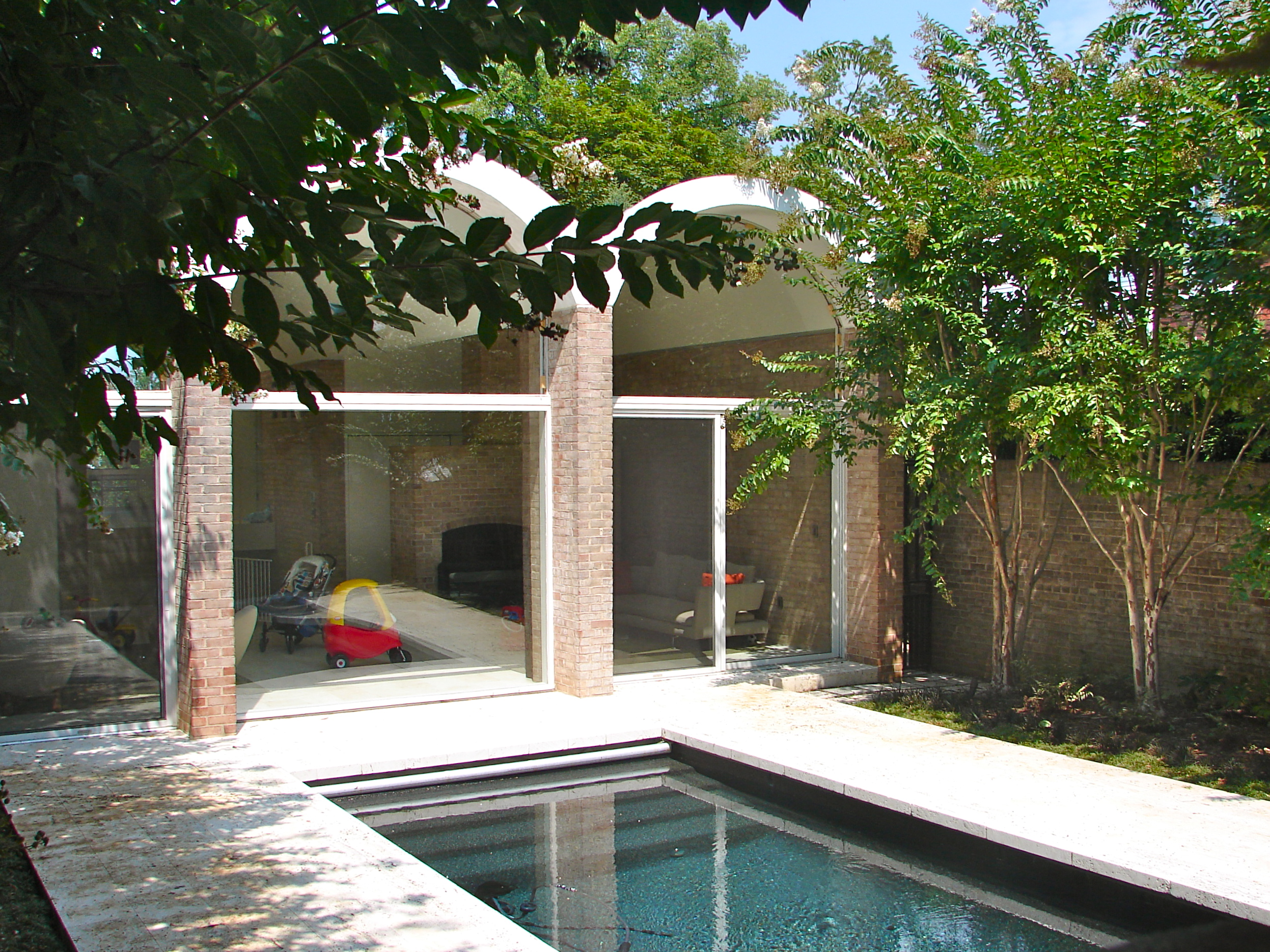

- Location within District of Columbia
- Location: 3411 Ordway St., NW, Washington, D.C.
- Coordinates: 38.93654737446242°N 77.06721323263672°W
- Area: 0.16 acres (650 m^{2})
- Architect: I.M. Pei
- Architectural style: International style
- NRHP reference No.: 08000956
- Added to NRHP: October 2, 2008

The William L. Slayton House located in the Cleveland Park neighborhood in Washington, D.C., is a house that was designed by I.M. Pei in the International Style. It was listed on the National Register of Historic Places on October 2, 2008, and was the 14th property listed as a featured property of the week in a program of the National Park Service that began in July, 2008.

== Design ==
The house is 2,600 square feet with a poured-in-place concrete roof consisting of three 13-foot high arched vaults. The front and rear elevations of the house are glass, resulting in a largely transparent house. The side walls are pale red brick.

== History ==
The house's original owner, William Slayton, met Pei in 1958 when they were both working in the office of William Zeckendorf. Zeckendorf developed rather utilitarian buildings such as parking garages, apartment complexes, and office buildings, but he had developed a love of architecture. In 1948, he wanted to become the patron of "the greatest unknown architect in the country", so he consulted with Nelson Rockefeller and embarked on a search which ended in his hiring I.M. Pei, who was then an assistant professor at Harvard University. Slayton was the vice-president in charge of the redevelopment of Washington's Southwest Urban Renewal Area. Slayton asked Pei in 1958 to design a home for him. Slayton recalled in his memoirs, "...on Ieoh Ming's and my next flight together, I asked if he would design us a house... He said he would be honored...but that I had to understand that it would have a major design feature that would be expensive." Slayton later served as the commissioner of the Urban Renewal Administration's Housing and Home Finance Agency during the John F. Kennedy administration.

Pei was known mostly as an architect of corporate buildings, municipal buildings, and art museums. He only designed three houses in his career. Besides the Slayton House, he designed his own residence in Katonah, New York, in 1954 and the Tandy House in Fort Worth, Texas, in 1969.
