= Park & Shop (Cleveland Park, Washington, D.C.) =

Early example of a neighborhood shopping center

Coordinates: 38.9361°N 77.0582°W

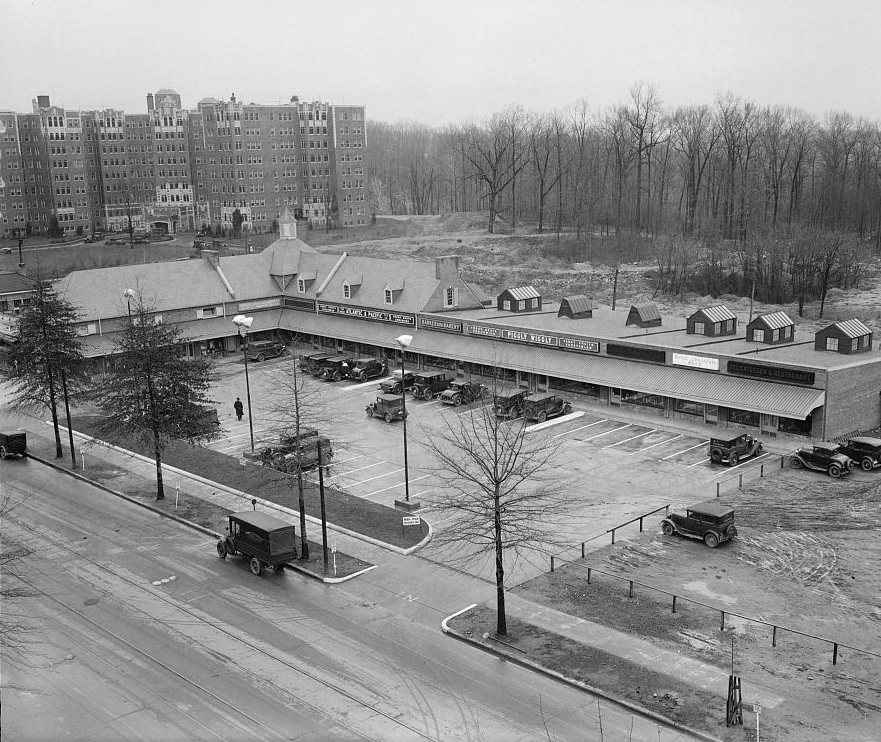
The Park & Shop is one of the earliest examples of a small center with dedicated on-site parking in front.

Park & Shop, also known as Sam's Park and Shop, in the Cleveland Park neighborhood of Washington, D.C., is one of the first neighborhood shopping centers (or strip malls). It opened in 1930 with 11 tenants and was anchored by two grocery stores: an A&P and a Piggly Wiggly. The center is still in operation, though largely empty since losing its anchor Target store in late 2025. It was built in an L shape with dedicated parking space for shoppers in the front, a novelty at the time. This stood in contrast to the limited availability and harried experience of street parking in front of stores lining busy streets. The original developer was Shannon & Luchs and the architect was Arthur B. Heaton.

From 2019 to 2025, it was anchored by a Target store; since then the anchor space is vacant. It is considered a model or "template" for future such neighborhood centers, or even "a pioneering example of strip-mall architecture", and for that reason has been subject to historic preservation efforts.

It was sold in 2020 to Asana Partners for $39 million.
