= Washington Convention Center =

Former convention center in Washington, D.C.

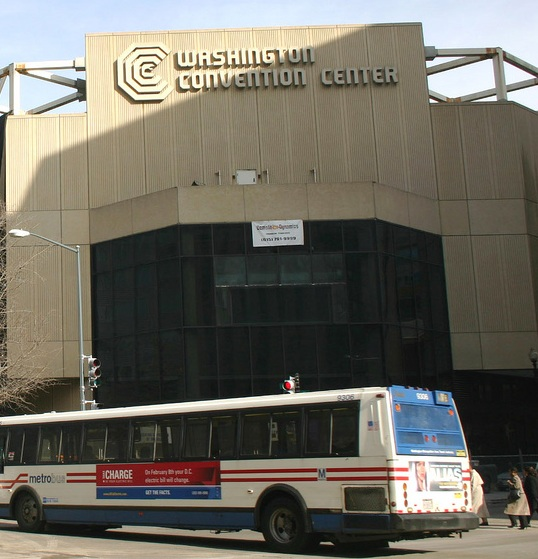
- Main entrance shortly before demolition
- Interactive map of Washington Convention Center
- Address: 909 H Street NW
- Location: Washington, D.C.
- Coordinates: 38.9007°N 77.025°W

Construction
- Built: 1980–1983
- Opened: December 10, 1982
- Closed: 2003
- Demolished: December 18, 2004
- Architect: Welton Becket Associates

The Washington Convention Center in Washington, D.C. was a convention center located at 909 H Street NW, occupying the city block bounded by New York Avenue, 9th Street, H Street, and 11th Street. Construction on the center began in 1980, and it opened on December 10, 1982. At 800,000 square feet (74,000 m^{2}), it was the fourth largest facility in the United States at the time. However, during the 1980s and 1990s, numerous larger and more modern facilities were constructed around the country, and by 1997 the Washington Convention Center had become the 30th largest facility.

== History ==
After being replaced by the new Walter E. Washington Convention Center one block northeast, the old convention center was demolished via explosive devices at approximately 7:30 a.m. on December 18, 2004, the first implosion in the city since the Capital Garage was razed in 1974.

Until 2011, the 10-acre (40,000 m^{2}) site was a municipal parking lot that was also used as the intercity bus terminal for Megabus and BoltBus. The site was also used for special events such as Cirque Du Soleil and the home of the Washington Kastles Stadium. However, construction of a new $950 million complex called CityCenterDC on the site began in March 2011.
