= Federation of Citizens Associations of the District of Columbia =

The Federation of Citizens Associations of the District of Columbia is composed of neighborhood associations from throughout the District of Columbia. The Federation was organized in 1910 and then incorporated in 1940. Most Citizens Associations were originally formed for white residents of city, versus Civic Associations that served black residents.
