= Equitable Co-operative Building Association =

- U.S. National Register of Historic Places
- U.S. Historic district – Contributing property
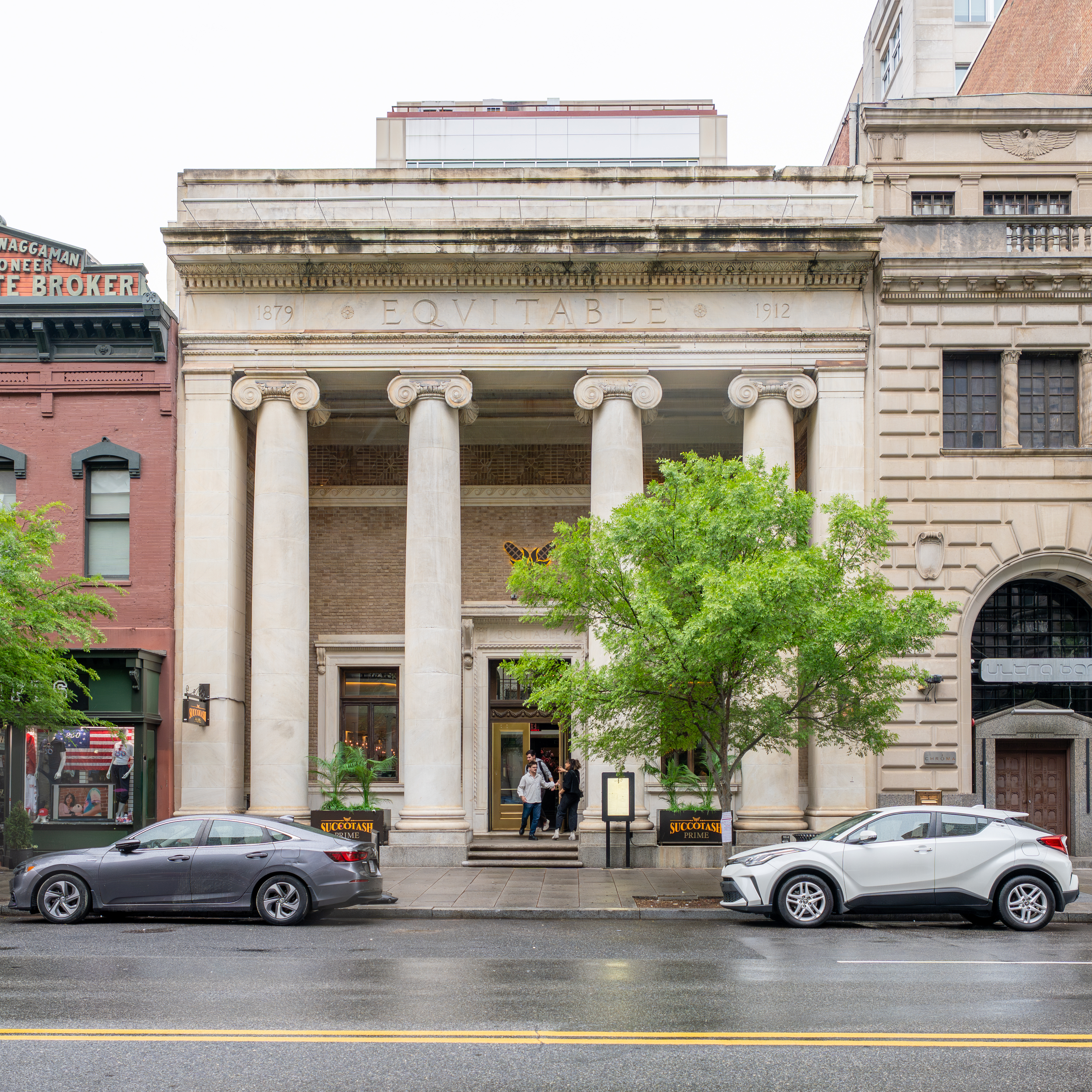
- Equitable Co-operative Building Association in 2026

- Location within Washington, D.C.
- Location: 915 F Street, N.W. Washington, D.C.
- Coordinates: 38°53′51.2″N 77°1′29.1″W
- Built: 1911
- Architect: Frederick B. Pyle, Arthur B. Heaton
- Architectural style: Neoclassical
- NRHP reference No.: 94001515
- Added to NRHP: December 29, 1994

The Equitable Co-operative Building Association is a historic building, located at 915 F Street, Northwest, Washington, D.C., in the Penn Quarter neighborhood. As of November 2018, it houses the second location of the restaurant Succotash.

== History ==
It was designed by Frederick B. Pyle and Arthur B. Heaton in the Neoclassical style. It was the headquarters of the Equitable Co-operative Building Association, of John Joy Edson.

It was added to the National Register of Historic Places in 1994, and is a contributing property to the Downtown Historic District. The 2009 property value of 915 F Street, NW is $3,155,100. It was owned by Abdul Khanu who operated the Platinum nightclub, Club Bounce. In 2009, Peter Andrulis III bought it and attempted to operate a Museum of Arts and Sciences. In 2011, Douglas Development Corp. bought it. In September 2017, Edward Lee opened a second location of Succotash restaurant in it after an extensive interior improvements.

The architectural drawings are held at the Library of Congress.
