= Warren Clark Jr. =

American diplomat (1936–2018)

Warren Clark (November 7, 1936, Bronxville, New York – July 24, 2018) was a career diplomat who served as an Ambassador of the United States to São Tomé and Príncipe as well as Gabon (1987–1989). When he returned stateside, he was first deputy to the assistant secretary of state for Africa. It has been said “ Clark played a key role in shaping the George H. W. Bush administration’s efforts to nudge the apartheid regime in South Africa to peacefully relinquish power.“

== Biography ==
Clark's parents were Warren Clark Sr. and Mary Dillon Clark, Clark graduated from the Hotchkiss School, Williams College, the Paul H. Nitze School of Advanced International Studies, Georgetown University and the John F. Kennedy School of Government. In 2005, Clark received a master's in theological studies from the Virginia Theological Seminary.

He retired from the Foreign Service in 1996, was executive director of Churches for Middle East Peace for eight years, as well as “ as a consultant on privatization and liberalization of telecommunications in eastern Europe.“

A resident of Mason's Island, Mystic, Connecticut and Cleveland Park, Washington, DC, Clark died of cancer.
