= Cleveland Park =

Neighborhood in Washington, D.C.

- Cleveland Park Historic District
- U.S. National Register of Historic Places
- U.S. Historic district
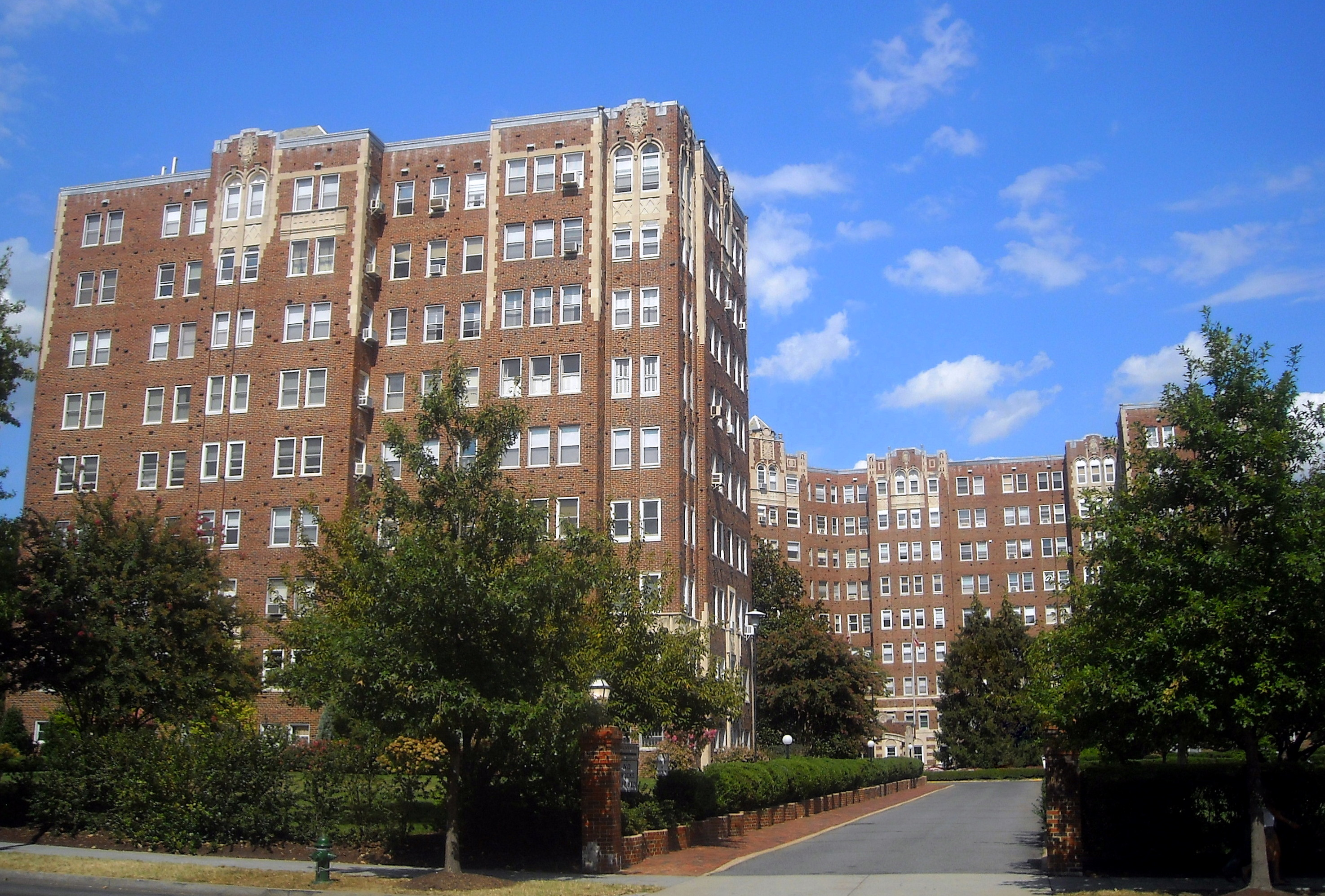
- The Broadmoor Apartments on Connecticut Avenue, designed by Joseph Abel in 1928, represent the eclecticism of that period

- Map of Washington, D.C., with Cleveland Park highlighted in maroon.
- Location: Roughly bounded by Tilden Street, Connecticut Avenue, Klingle Road, and Wisconsin Avenue, Washington, DC
- Built: 1886
- Architect: Francis R. Allen; Et al.
- Architectural style: Bungalow/craftsman, Italianate, Queen Anne
- NRHP reference No.: 87000628
- Added to NRHP: April 27, 1987

Cleveland Park is a residential neighborhood in the Northwest quadrant of Washington, D.C. It is located at and bounded approximately by Rock Creek Park to the east, Wisconsin and Idaho Avenues to the west, Klingle and Woodley Roads to the south, and Rodman and Tilden Streets to the north. Its main commercial corridor lies along Connecticut Avenue NW, where the eponymous Cleveland Park station of the Washington Metro's Red Line can be found; another commercial corridor lies along Wisconsin Avenue. The neighborhood is known for its many late 19th century homes and the historic Art Deco Uptown Theater. It is also home to the William L. Slayton House and the Park and Shop, built in 1930 and one of the earliest strip malls.

It is named after Grover Cleveland, who owned property in the area.

== History ==
The first known settler was General Uriah Forrest, an aide-de-camp of George Washington who built an estate called Rosedale (now at 3501 Newark Street) in 1793, when he began serving as a Congressman from Maryland. Later, it housed Youth For Understanding, an international student exchange organization. In 2002, the Rosedale grounds were placed in a public conservancy, and the farmhouse, said to be the oldest house in Washington, returned to residential use. Other estates followed. Gardiner Greene Hubbard, first president of the National Geographic Society, built the colonial Georgian revival Twin Oaks on 50 acres (200,000 m²) in 1888. It was used as a summer home by the Hubbard family, including Alexander Graham Bell, and is today home of the diplomatic mission of the Republic of China on Taiwan. Tregaron, present-day home of the Washington International School, is a Georgian house built in 1912.

The neighborhood acquired its name after 1886, when President Grover Cleveland purchased a stone farmhouse opposite Rosedale and remodeled it into a Queen Anne-style summer estate called Oak View or Oak Hill (by other accounts, Red Top). After Cleveland lost his bid for re-election in 1888, he sold the property in February 1890 to developer Francis Newlands, whose under-construction Rock Creek Railway streetcar line would galvanize the area's development. The Oak View subdivision was platted that year, the Cleveland Heights subdivision around the same time, and the Cleveland Park subdivision soon thereafter. Red Top in the meantime was inhabited by Washington architect Robert I. Fleming and later by his widow, and eventually demolished in 1927 to be replaced on the same site by the neo-Georgian mansion that still stands at 3536 Newark Street NW.

Early large-scale development was spurred by the neighborhood's upland topography, which provided a breezy relief from the hot, fetid air in the lowlands that were then the built-up area of Washington, D.C. Most of the houses built during this period show their intended use as summer houses in the era before air conditioning, having such architectural features as wide porches, large windows, and long, overhanging eaves.

While the first subdivisions were made in response to the extension of the Georgetown and Tennallytown electric streetcar line along Wisconsin Avenue, the success of the neighborhood was due to Newlands' construction of upper Connecticut Avenue and the streetcar line that ran up its center. Once the Rock Creek Railway began running between Cleveland Park and downtown Washington in 1892, the neighborhood's second phase of development, as a "streetcar suburb", began. The Cleveland Park Company oversaw construction on numerous plots starting in 1894. Most houses were designed by individual architects and builders, including Waddy B. Wood and Paul J. Pelz, resulting in an eclectic mix of the popular architectural styles of the time, notably the Queen Anne style (including the Shingle style), Georgian Revival, and the Mission Revival. In later years, simpler schools of design such as the Prairie style and Tudor Revival came to dominate.

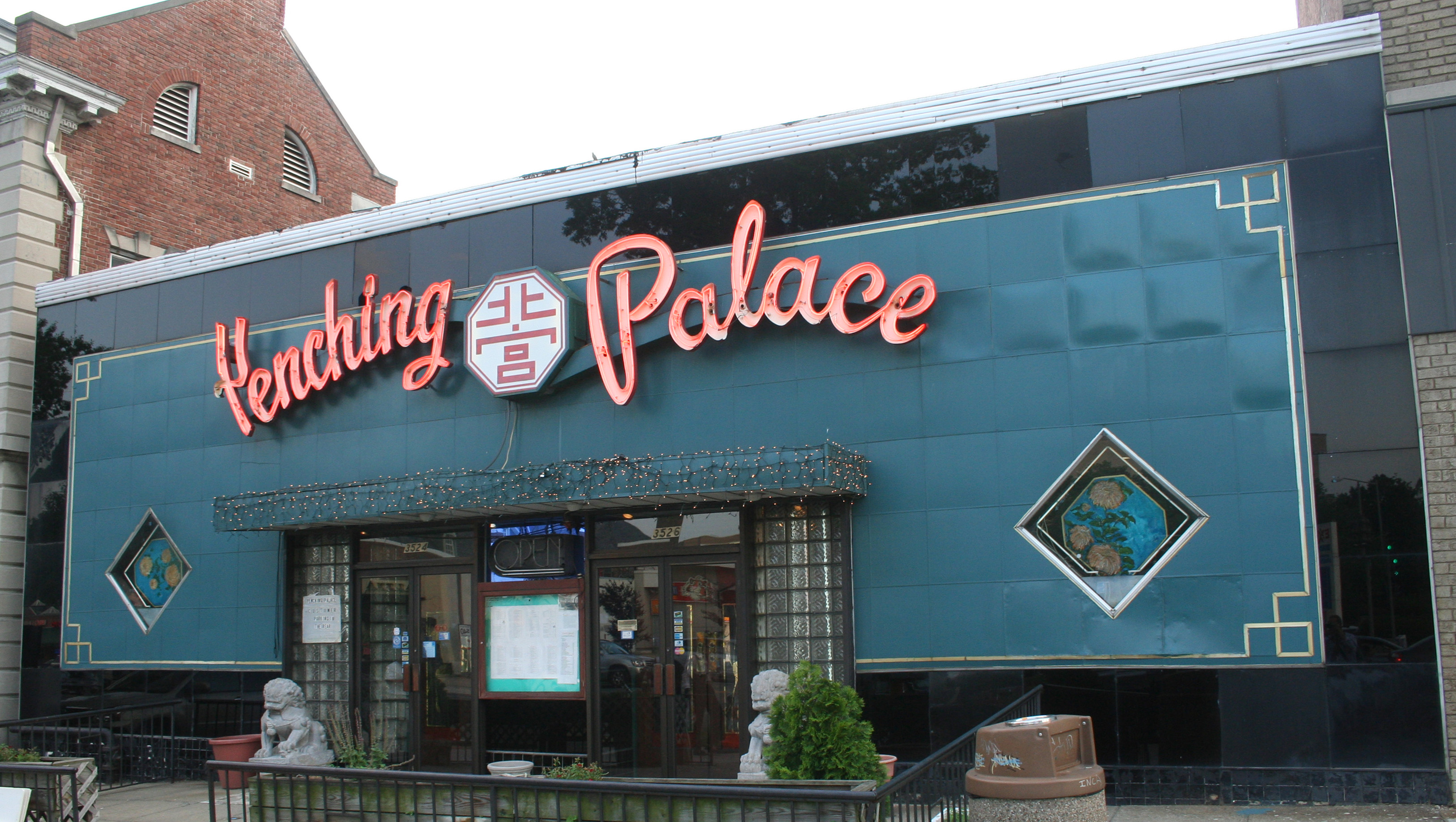
Yenching Palace, a historic Chinese restaurant where American and Soviet negotiators met in 1962 to seek a resolution to the Cuban Missile Crisis. The space was occupied by a Walgreens after the restaurant closed. It was vacant as of 2021.

Development proceeded in fits and starts, punctuated by such events as the bankruptcy of the Cleveland Park Company in 1905 and the Great Depression in the 1930s. As a result, houses of very different sizes, natures, and styles can often be seen next to one another. In the later 20th century, Winthrop Faulkner and I. M. Pei designed houses in the neighborhood as well.

The Park and Shop (1930) was one of the first two strip malls or neighborhood shopping centers in the U.S. It was anchored by Piggly Wiggly and built in an L shape with dedicated parking space for shoppers in the front, a novelty at the time. The center still exists, anchored by a Target store.

== Civic Groups ==
The Cleveland Park Citizens Association (CPCA) was established in 1911 by residents of the Cleveland Park area. The Association was incorporated in 1964 as the "Connecticut Avenue Citizens Association." The name was changed in 1966 to the current name, Cleveland Park Citizens Association. Over the years, it has raised money for the construction of the local library branch, the Cleveland Park Neighborhood Library. It is a member of the Federation of Citizens Associations of the District of Columbia.

The Cleveland Park Historical Society, founded 1985, strives to document and preserve the history and architecture of the neighborhood, and especially the historic district, which was designated in 1987. The Society sponsors an annual house tour in the neighborhood.

The Cleveland Park Club was founded in 1922 to "promote social intercourse, recreation and sports, literature and the arts, and for mutual improvement" of the neighborhood in the days before television and widespread broadcasting and movies. The next year, the Club purchased a 1900 house to use as its base. Events included such entertainment as plays, songfests, and dances. With the construction of a swimming pool, the Club became more centered on recreational swimming, although other activities, including annual potluck suppers on Memorial Day and Labor Day, a day camp, and other occasional social and educational events continue.

== Education ==
District of Columbia Public Schools operates several public schools that serve children residing in Cleveland Park. Some of the zoned schools reside in nearby neighborhoods. Zoned schools include:

- Elementary schools: Phoebe Hearst Elementary and John Eaton Elementary School
- Alice Deal Middle School and Hardy Middle School
- Jackson-Reed High School

The Washington International School operates an upper-school campus (located on the Tregaron Estate) in the neighborhood, located off of Macomb Street between Connecticut Avenue and 34th Street. The National Child Research Center operates a nursery school in the neighborhood; National Cathedral School, St. Albans School, Beauvoir School, and Sidwell Friends School are located at the edge of the customary boundary of Cleveland Park.

The District of Columbia Public Library system operates the Cleveland Park Neighborhood Library, which was completely rebuilt between 2016 and 2018. The library building reopened June 16, 2018.

== Gallery ==
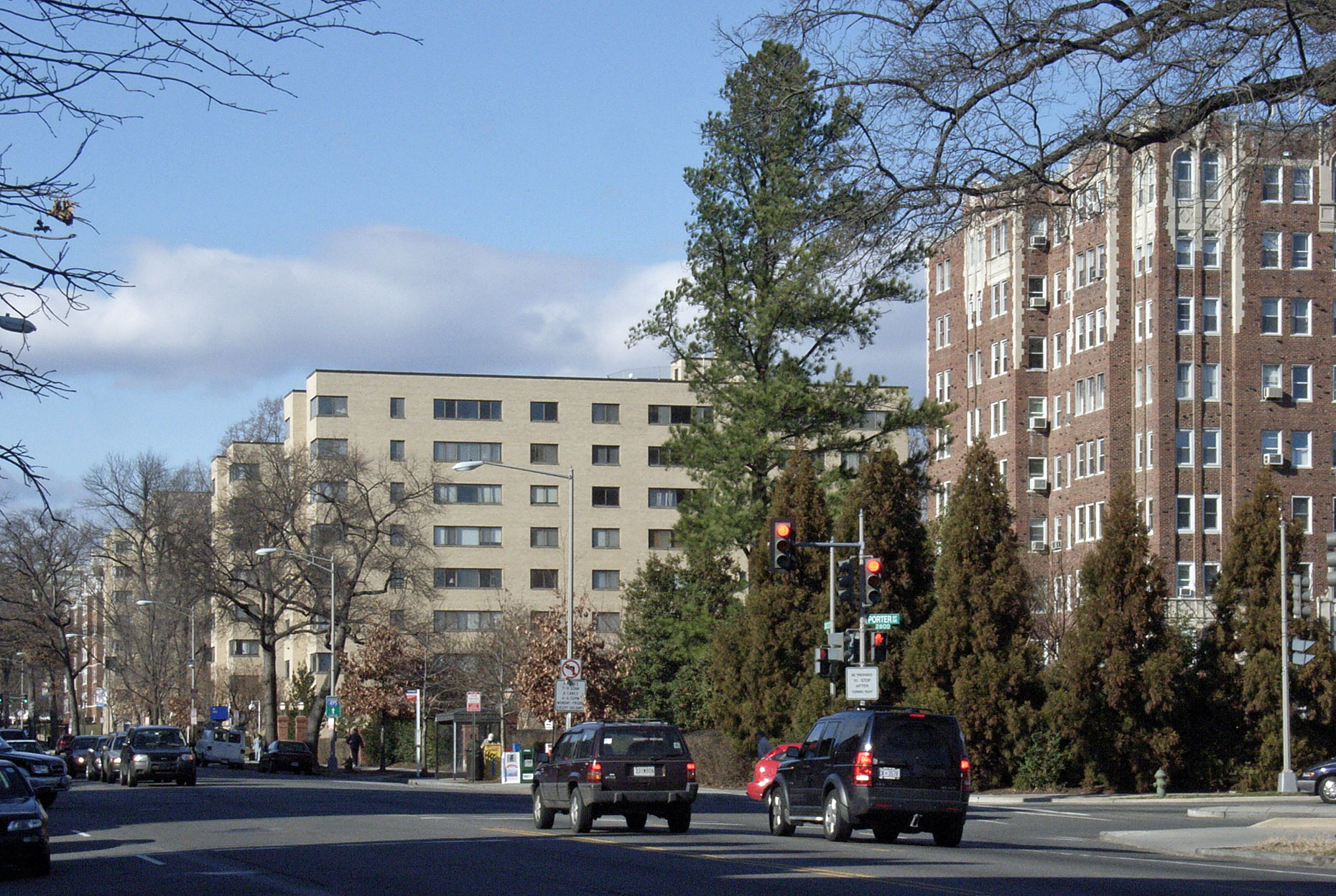
Connecticut Avenue viewed towards the north in Cleveland Park.

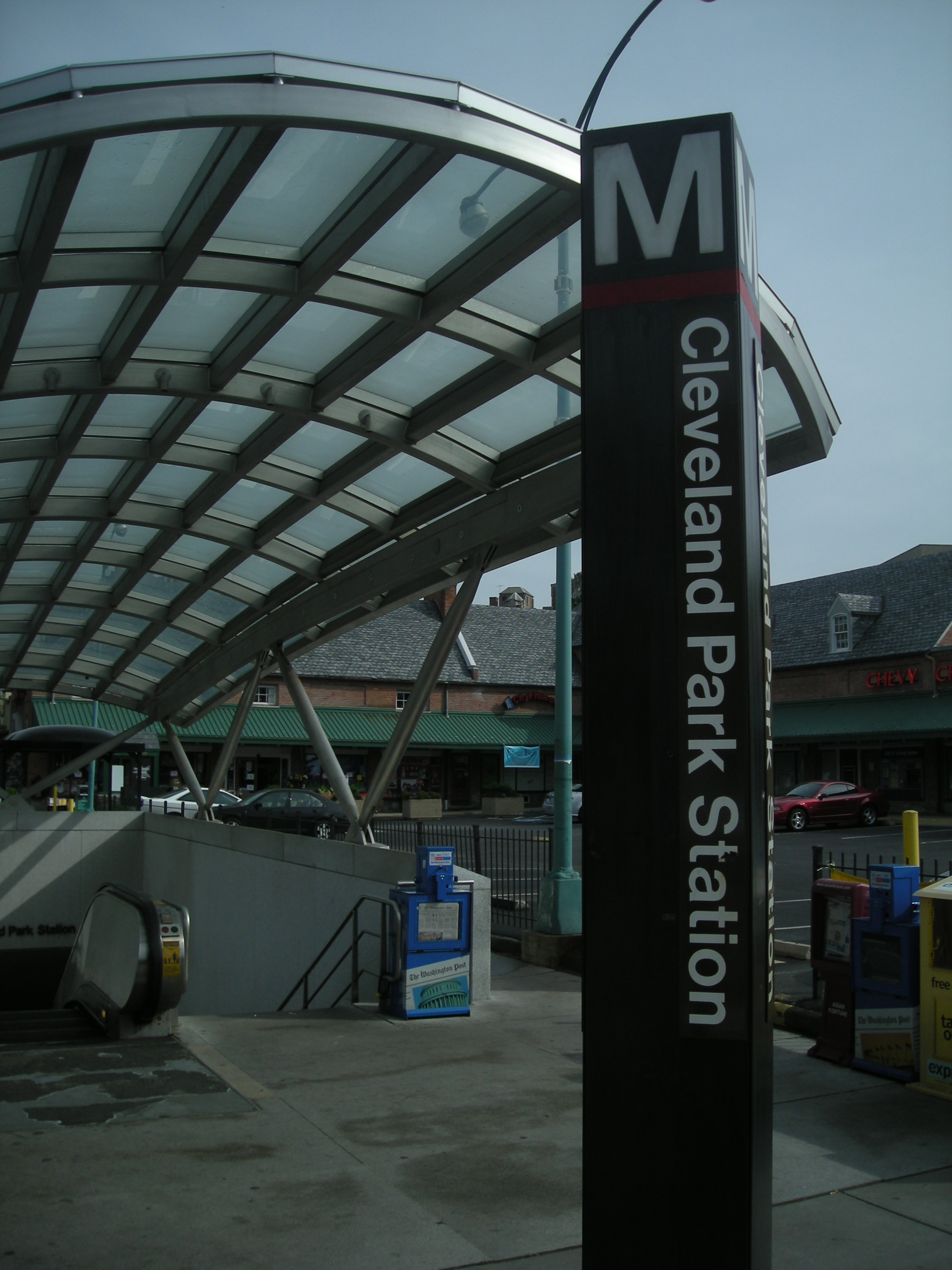
Cleveland Park Metro Station Entrance.

Uptown Theater on Connecticut Avenue.

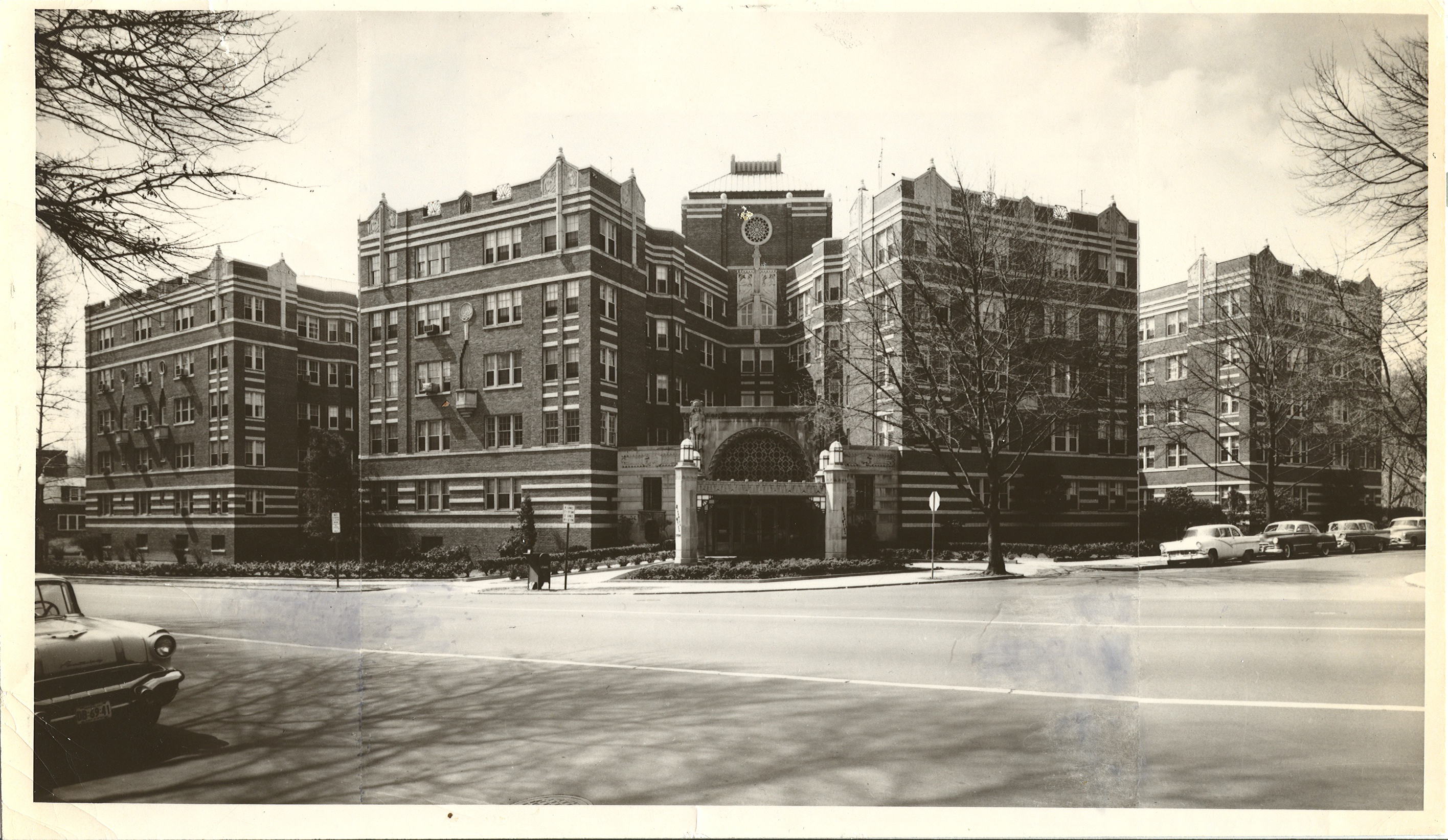
Historic photo of Sedgwick Gardens apartments.

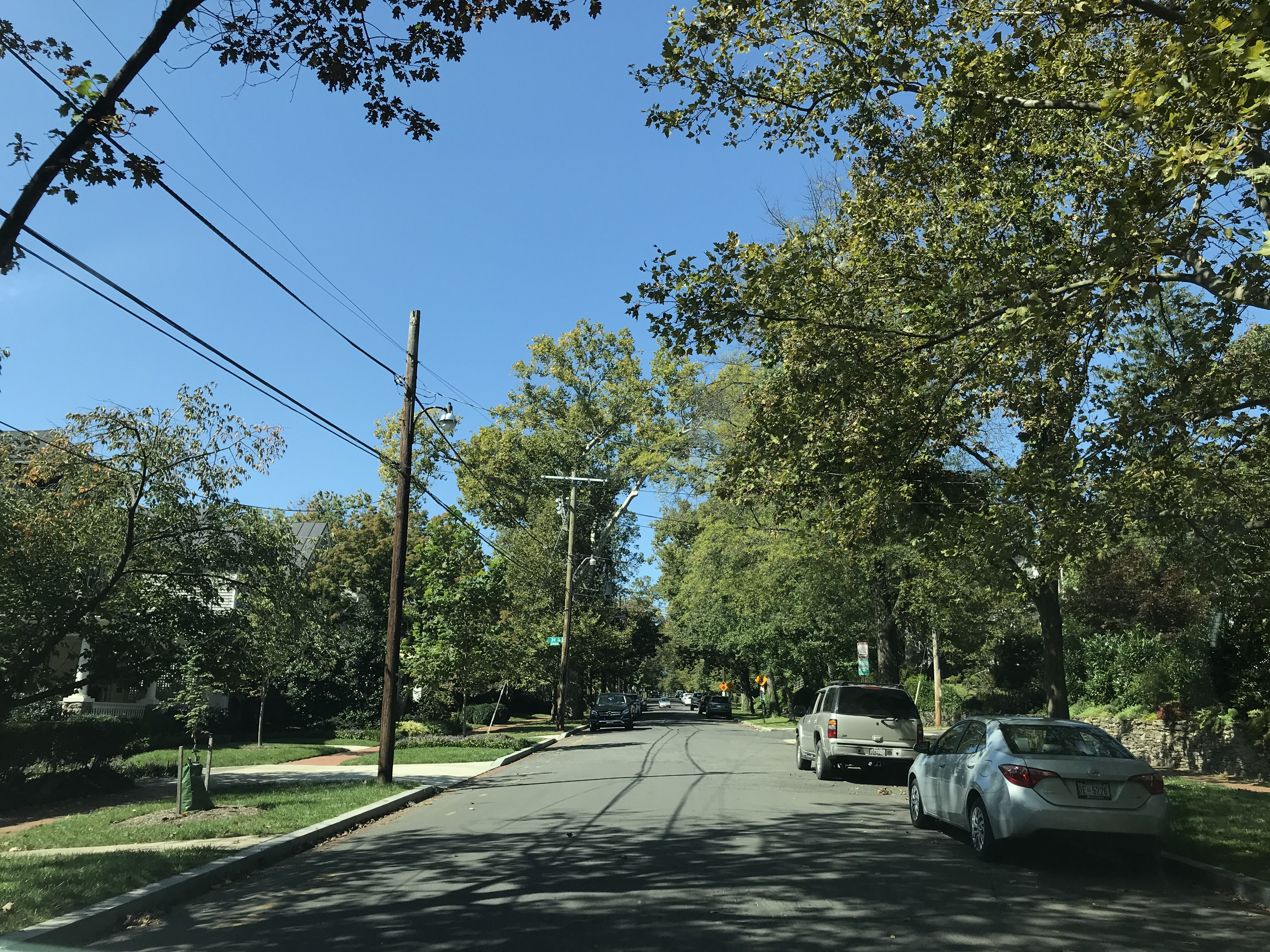
Newark St NW looking towards 35th St NW (September 2020).

== Notable residents ==
- Robert A. Altman, chairman of ZeniMax Media
- David Brooks, columnist for The New York Times
- Warren Clark Jr. (1936–2018), ambassador from the United States to São Tomé and Príncipe and Gabon
- Grover Cleveland (1837–1908), 22nd and 24th president of the United States
- Joe Englert (1961–2020), restaurateur
- Al Hunt, columnist for Bloomberg View, and Judy Woodruff, television news anchor and journalist
- Jim Lehrer, journalist and novelist
- Ana Montes, Defense Intelligence Agency employee who spied for Cuba
- Marjorie Townsend (1930–2015), NASA engineer
- David Ignatius, journalist and author
- Julian Steward, anthropologist.
