= Riggs National Bank, Washington Loan and Trust Company Branch =

Historic building in Washington, D.C.

- Riggs National Bank, Washington Loan And Trust Company Branch
- U.S. National Register of Historic Places
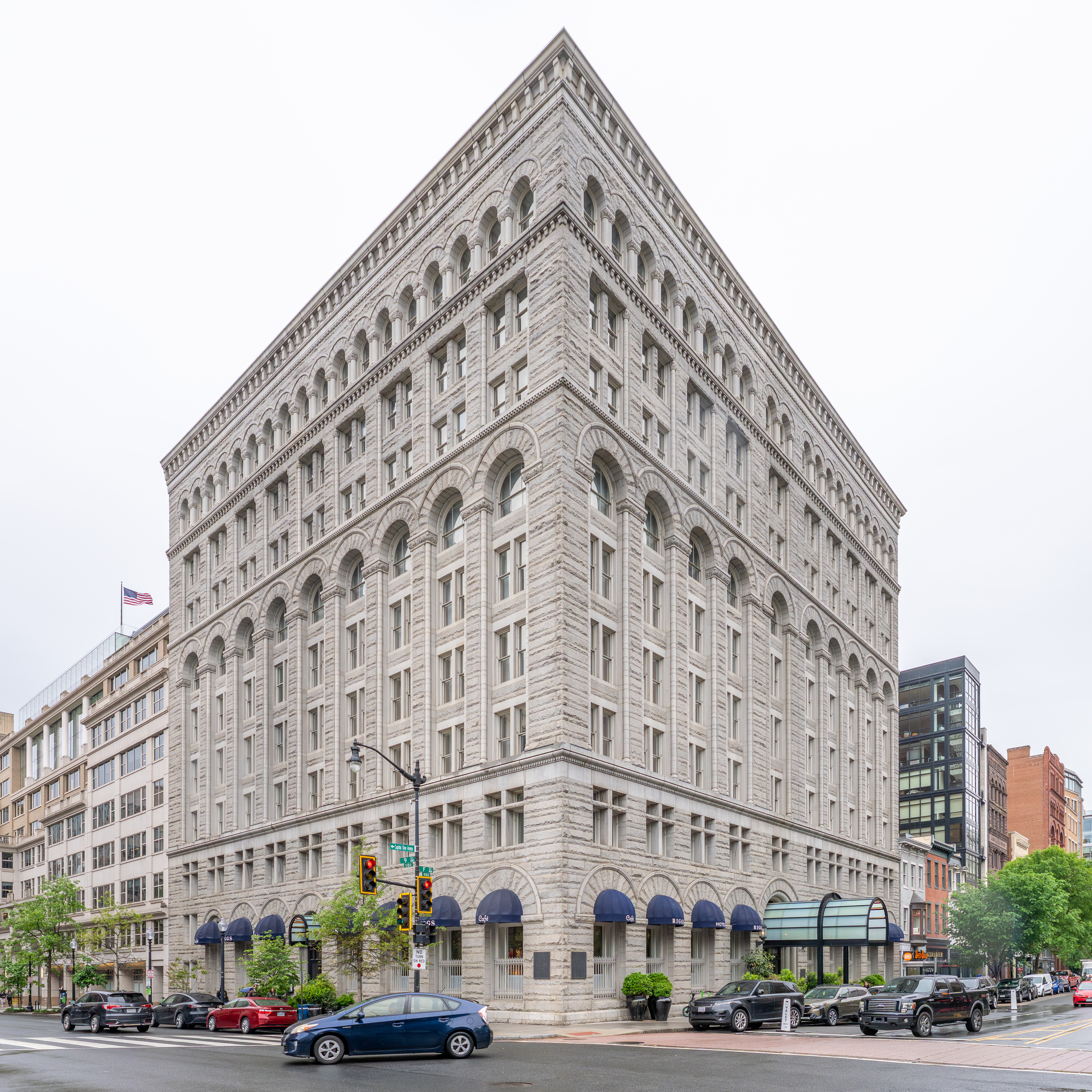
- Riggs National Bank, Washington Loan and Trust Company Branch in 2026

- Location within Central Washington, D.C. Location within the District of Columbia Location within the United States
- Location: SW corner of 9th and F Sts., NW., Washington, District of Columbia
- Coordinates: 38°53′49.7″N 77°1′27.3″W
- Area: 0.3 acres (0.12 ha)
- Built: 1891
- Architect: James Hill, Arthur Heaton
- Architectural style: Richardsonian Romanesque
- NRHP reference No.: 71001005
- Added to NRHP: May 6, 1971

The Riggs National Bank, Washington Loan And Trust Company Branch, also known as Washington Loan and Trust, is an historic building in the Penn Quarter neighborhood of Washington, D.C. It currently serves as a hotel.

== History ==
It was built in 1891 for the Washington Loan And Trust Company, founded by Brainard Warner. It was a work of James G. Hill and Arthur B. Heaton. It was listed on the National Register of Historic Places in 1971 for its architecture, which is Romanesque Revival and Richardsonian Romanesque.

The building was converted to the Courtyard Washington Convention Center Hotel in 1999. The hotel closed in 2018 for a major renovation and reopened in 2019 as Riggs Washington DC Hotel. The Riggs Washington DC was then inducted into Historic Hotels of America, an official program of the National Trust for Historic Preservation, that same year.

== See also ==
- Riggs National Bank, also NRHP-listed in Washington, D.C.
