= Augusta Apartment Building =

- U.S. National Register of Historic Places
- D.C. Inventory of Historic Sites
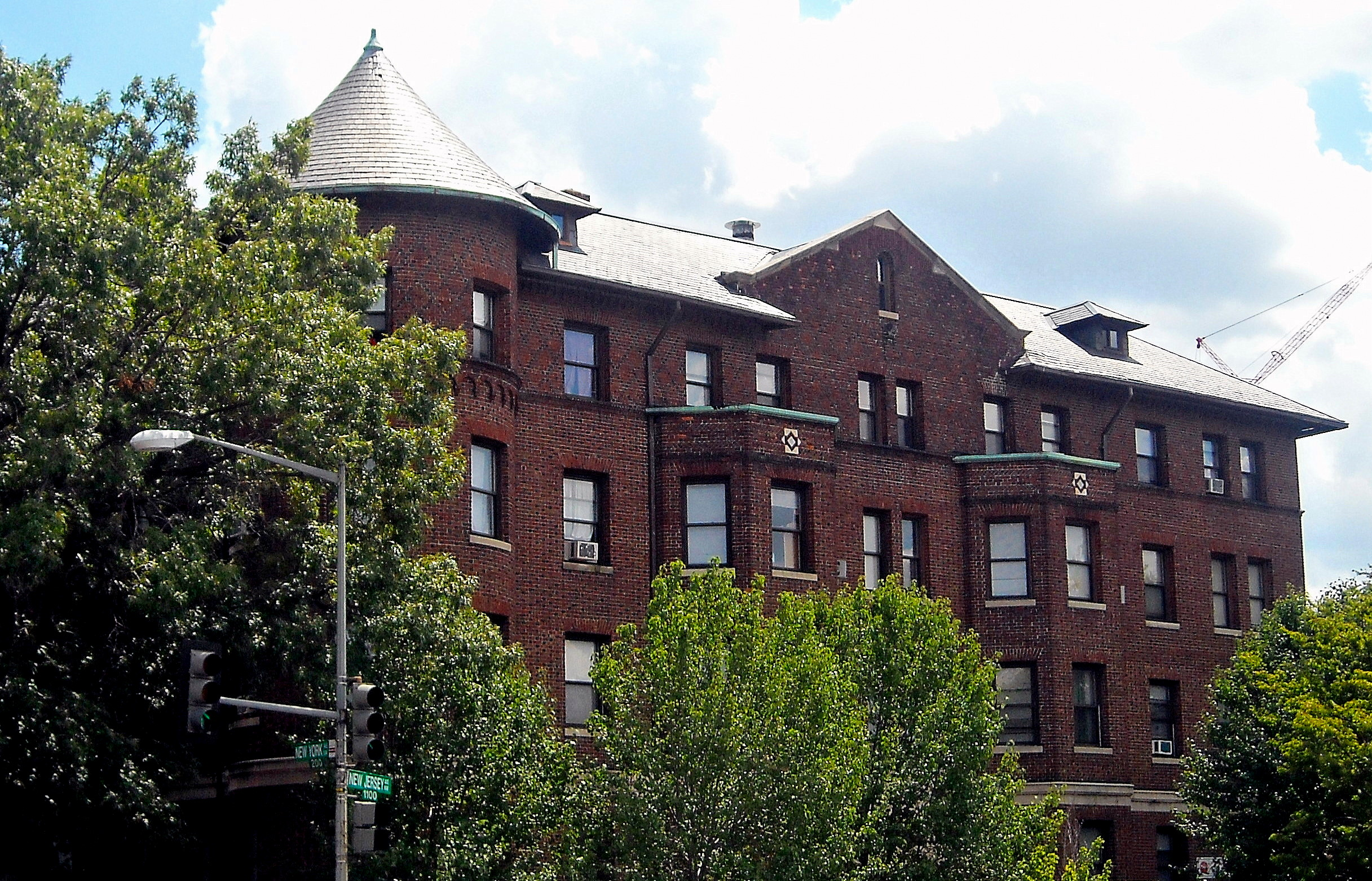
- Augusta Apartment Building in 2008

- Location within Washington, D.C.
- Location: 1151 New Jersey Ave., NW (216 New York Ave., NW); Washington, D.C.
- Coordinates: 38°54′19″N 77°0′52″W
- Built: 1900
- Architect: Arthur B. Heaton
- Architectural style: Tudor Revival
- MPS: Apartment Buildings in Washington, DC, MPS
- NRHP reference No.: 94001032

Significant dates
- Added to NRHP: September 9, 1994
- Designated DCIHS: January 17, 1990

The Augusta Apartment Building, along with the Louisa Apartment Building, are historic structures located in the Northwest Quadrant of Washington, D.C. Washington architect Arthur B. Heaton designed both buildings, which were built a year apart from one another in 1900 and 1901. They are two of his earliest commissions. The Tudor Revival façade of the buildings emulate the mansions that were built during the late Victorian age. The exterior features Flemish bond and tapestry brick with decorative motifs in both tile and limestone. It was listed on the National Register of Historic Places in 1994.
