= E. Warren Clark =

American educator (1849–1907)

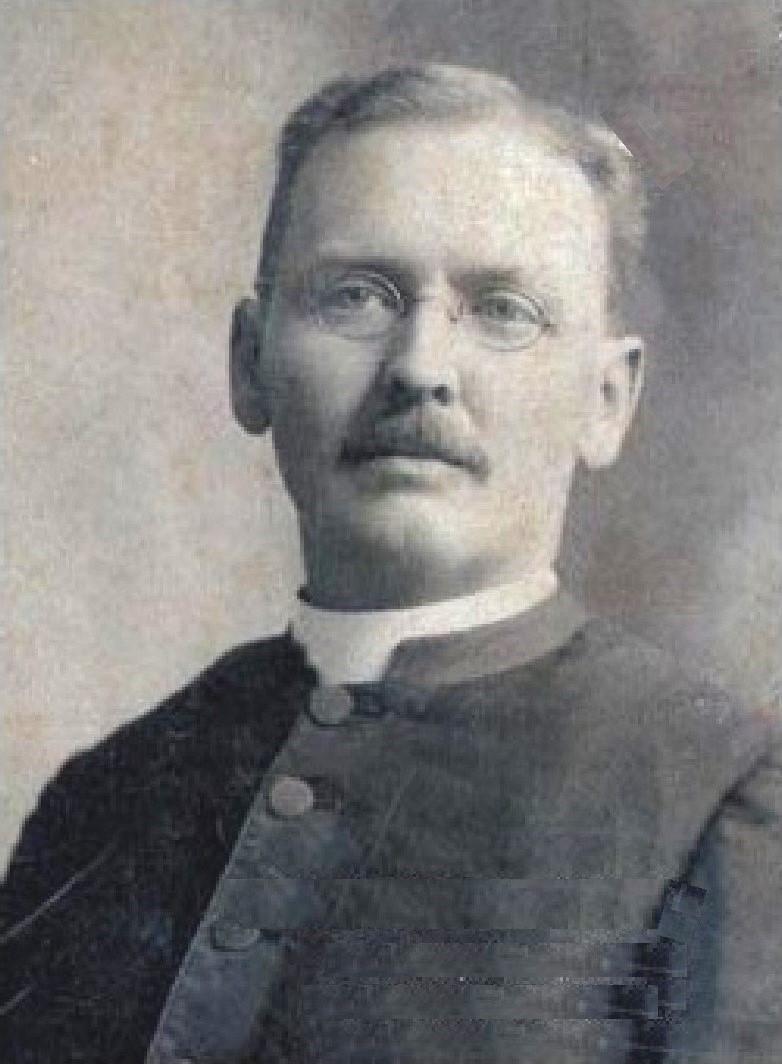

Edward Warren Clark (January 27, 1849 – June 5, 1907) was an American educator who taught thousands of young Japanese the rudiments of modern science while employed as a teacher in Japan from 1871 to 1875.

== Biography ==
Edward Warren Clark was born on January 27, 1849, in Portsmouth, New Hampshire to Rufus Wheelwright Clark and Eliza C Clark. Clark and his family moved from Portsmouth to New York when he was six. He graduated from what is now Rutgers University in New Jersey in 1869 with a degree in Chemistry and Biology. He was one of several hundred teachers hired by the Japanese government to familiarize students with the science and technology of the West. Clark first taught at a school in Shizuoka that trained students to become science teachers. He later taught at what became Tokyo University in Tokyo, where he helped to found the chemistry department, one of the first of its kind in Japan. A devout Christian, Clark sought to introduce the Bible and Christian doctrines to his students whenever possible. After returning to the United States Clark wrote a highly informative book about Japan: Life and Adventure in Japan.

Clark, who later became an Episcopalian priest, visited Japan on two later occasions and worked hard to garner American support for Japan during the Russo-Japanese War (1904–05). Clark was a close associate of William Elliot Griffis (1842–1928), widely regarded as the first major American Japanologist.
