= Churchill Hotel (Washington, D.C.) =

Churchill Hotel Near Embassy Row
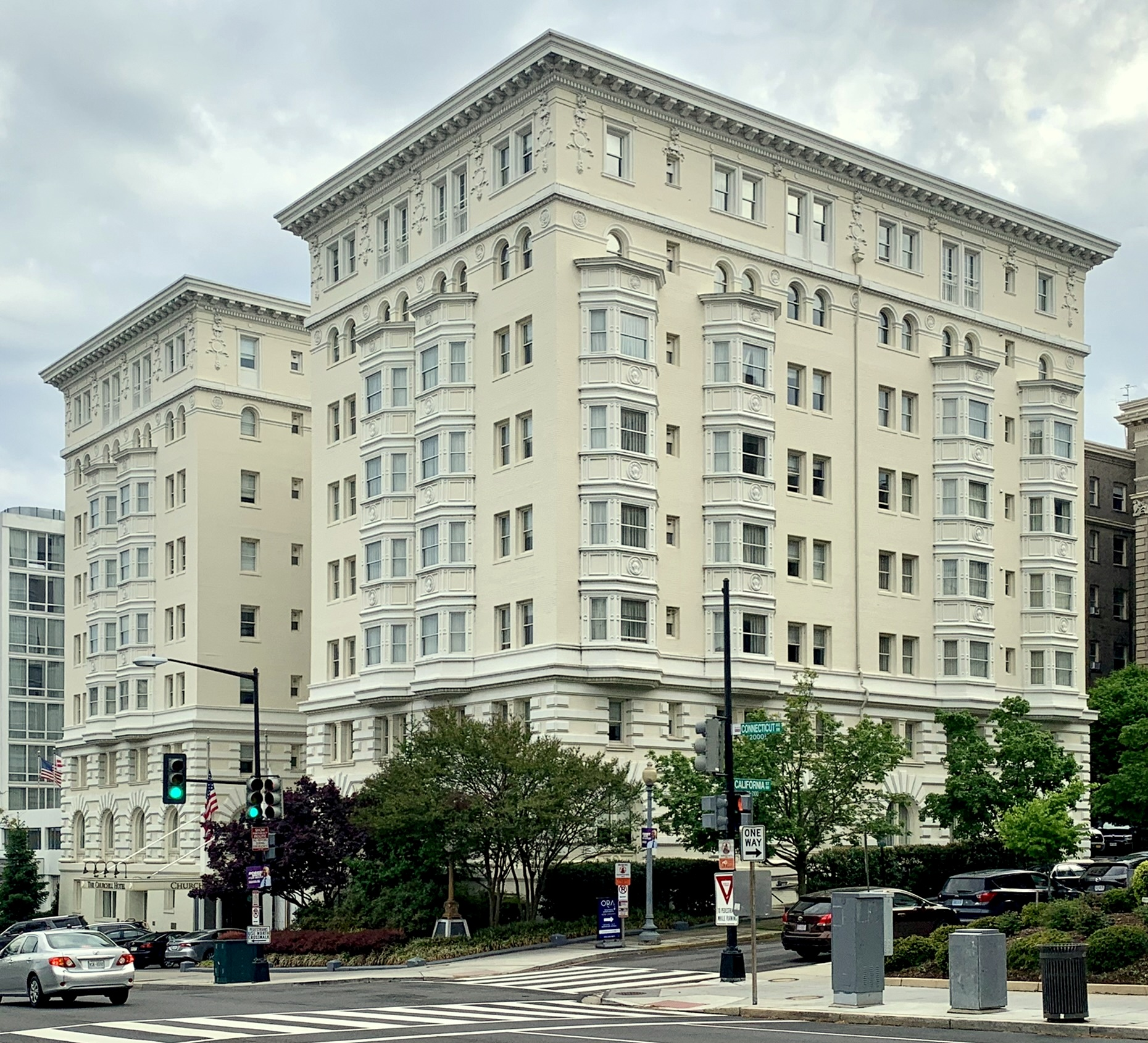
- Churchill Hotel in 2022

- Location within Washington, D.C.

General information
- Type: Hotel
- Location: Dupont Circle, 1914 Connecticut Avenue NW, Washington, D.C., United States
- Coordinates: 38°54′59″N 77°2′49″W
- Current tenants: Public hotel
- Completed: 1902
- Owner: Churchill Hotel Near Embassy Row
- Landlord: Churchill Hotel

Other information
- Parking: Valet and standard

Website
- www.thechurchillhotel.com

The Churchill Hotel Near Embassy Row is a hotel located at 1914 Connecticut Avenue NW in Washington, D.C., United States. The Beaux-Arts style building was erected in 1902 as The Highlands apartment house, designed by local architect Arthur B. Heaton. It was later renovated into a hotel, but still kept some of its historic features. According to the Churchill Hotel, its rooms contain elements of the original building. The Churchill is a member of Historic Hotels of America, the official program of the National Trust for Historic Preservation.
