= Neighborhood shopping center =

Retail industry term

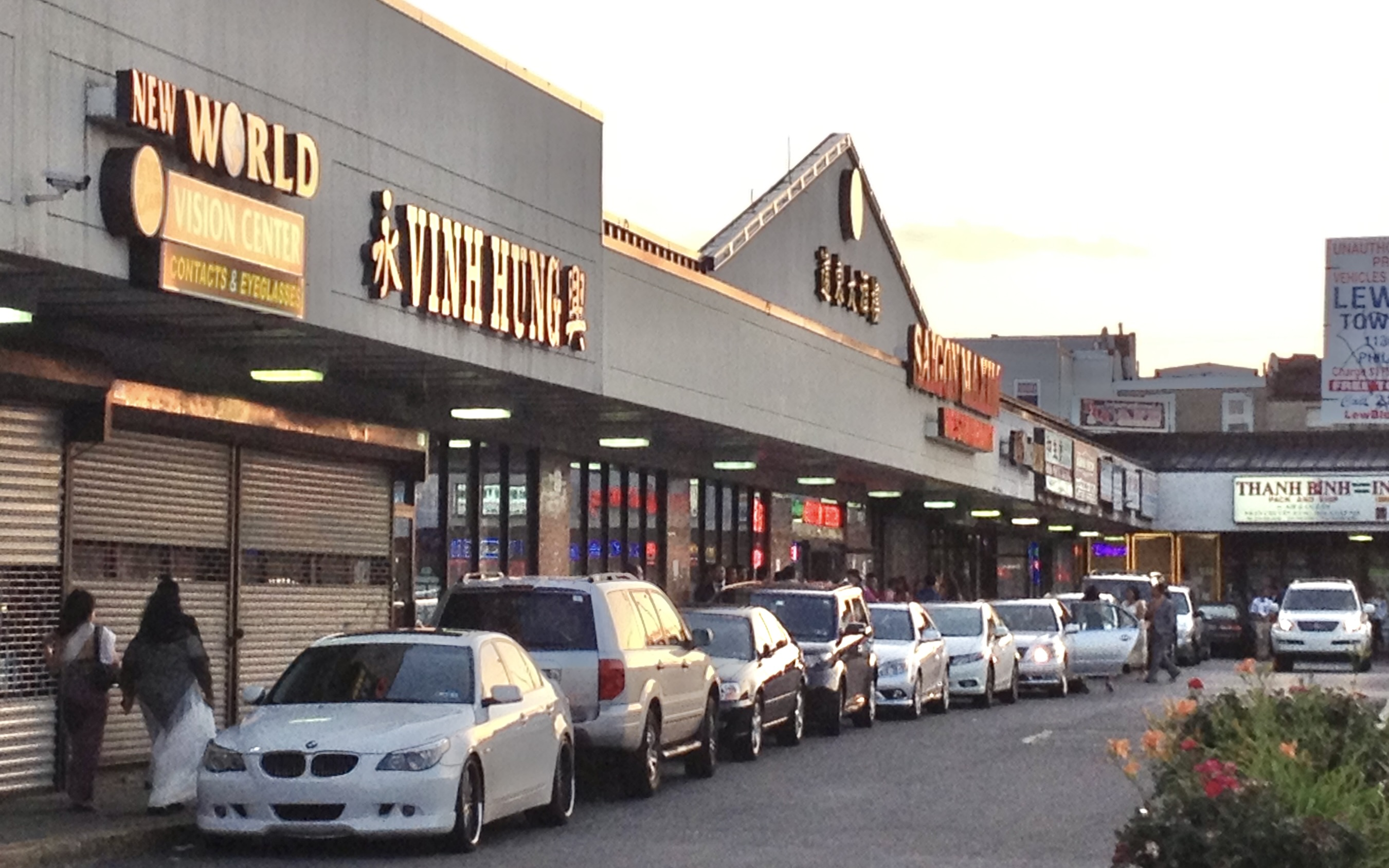
A neighborhood shopping center catering to Vietnamese Americans in Little Saigon, Philadelphia

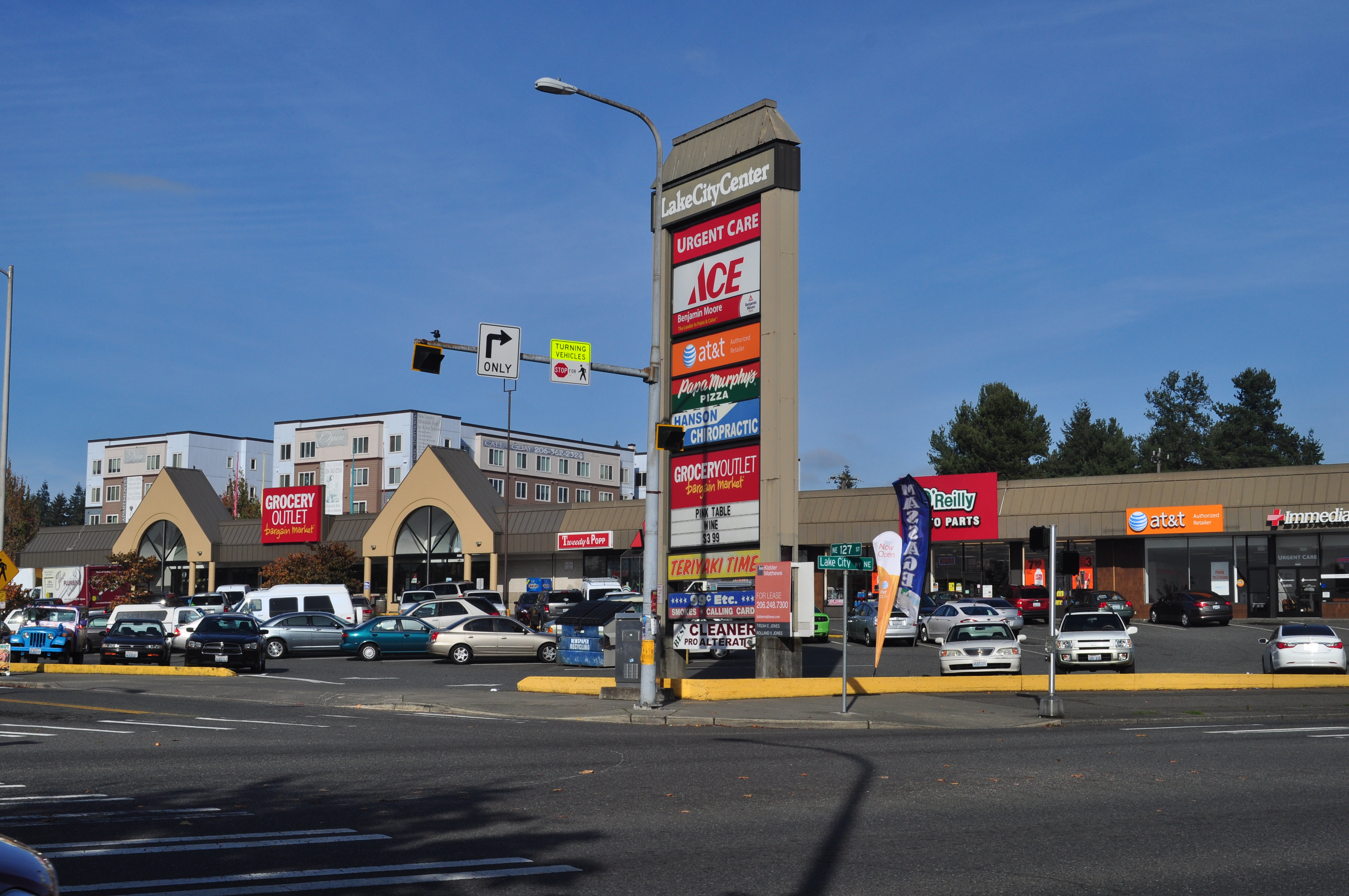
Lake City Center in Seattle, at 51,050 square feet (4,743 m^{2}) qualifies as a small neighborhood shopping center. It is anchored by a supermarket.

A neighborhood shopping center (Commonwealth English: neighbourhood shopping centre) is an industry term in the United States for a shopping center with 30,000 to 125,000 square feet (2,800 to 11,600 m^{2}) of gross leasable area, typically anchored by a supermarket and/or large drugstore.

== Versus other formats ==
- Community centers: Slightly larger centers 125,000 to 400,000 square feet (11,600 to 37,200 m^{2}) with general merchandise or convenience- oriented offerings are termed as community centers or large neighborhood centers by the ICSC (International Council of Shopping Centers), who state that they typically have a "wider range of apparel and other soft goods offerings than neighborhood centers. The center is usually configured in a straight line as a strip, or may be laid out in an L or U shape, depending on the site and design."
- Power centers: Even larger centers of 250,000 to 600,000 square feet (23,000 to 56,000 m^{2}) are considered power centers, typically anchored by category-killer big box stores (e.g. Best Buy) incl. discount department stores (e.g. Target) and wholesale clubs (e.g. Costco).
- Strip malls: Open-air centers under 30,000 square feet (2,800 m^{2}) are generally considered strip malls.

== Versus European terminology ==
In Europe, any shopping center with mostly "retail warehouse units" (UK terminology; in the US these are called "big box stores" or superstores), 5000 sqm or larger, 53,819 sq. ft., is a retail park, according to the leading real estate company Cushman & Wakefield. Therefore, some neighborhood shopping centers in the United States might be considered "retail parks" in Europe, depending on the tenant mix.

== History ==
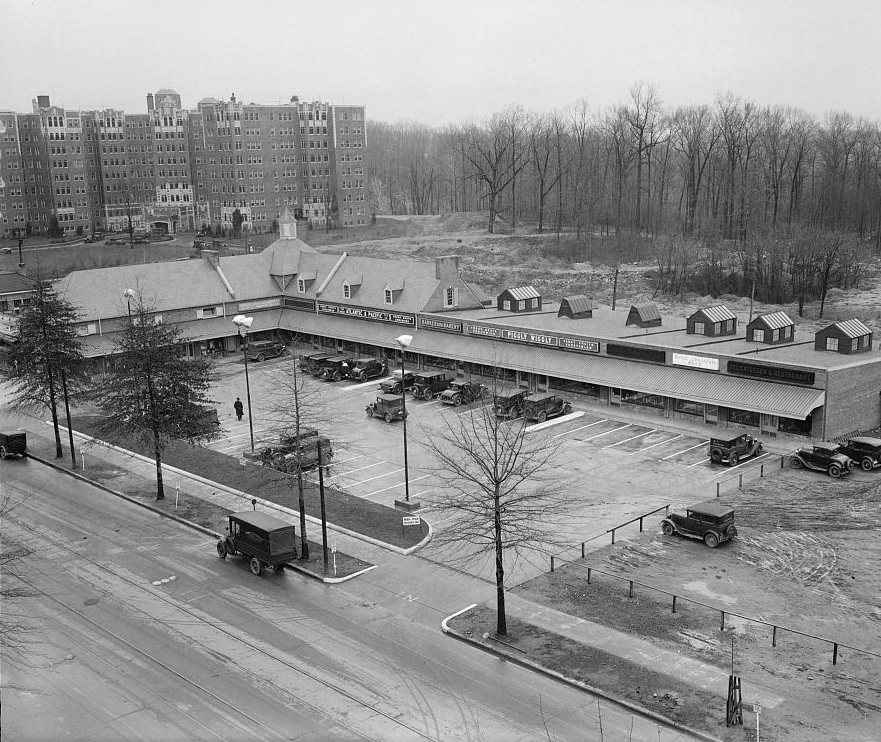
The Park & Shop in Cleveland Park, Washington, D.C. (1930) is one of the earliest examples of a small center with dedicated on-site parking in front.

Before the 1930s, there were only a few examples of this type of shopping center, typically built as part of new, planned, upscale residential developments. During the 1930s the neighborhood center not only emerged as an important element of the retail landscape in the United States, but also became one of the first common building forms to be adapted for the society's widespread adoption of the automobile. Already by 1940, the neighborhood shopping center was seen as a good format for serving the shopping needs of people in suburban areas in general. Washington, D. C., was the area where different experimental forms were built.

The Bank Block in Grandview Heights, Ohio (1928) was an early neighborhood center of 30 shops built along Grandview Avenue, with parking in the back for 400 cars. Uniquely for the time, it had multiple national grocery store tenants Kroger, Piggly Wiggly, and the A&P Tea Company. The 1930 Park & Shop (Cleveland Park, Washington, D.C.) was another early neighborhood center. It was anchored by Piggly Wiggly and built in an L shape with dedicated parking space for shoppers in the front, a novelty at the time. The center still exists, anchored by a Target store.
