= Tregaron Estate =

Historic house in Washington, D.C., United States

- The Causeway
- U.S. National Register of Historic Places
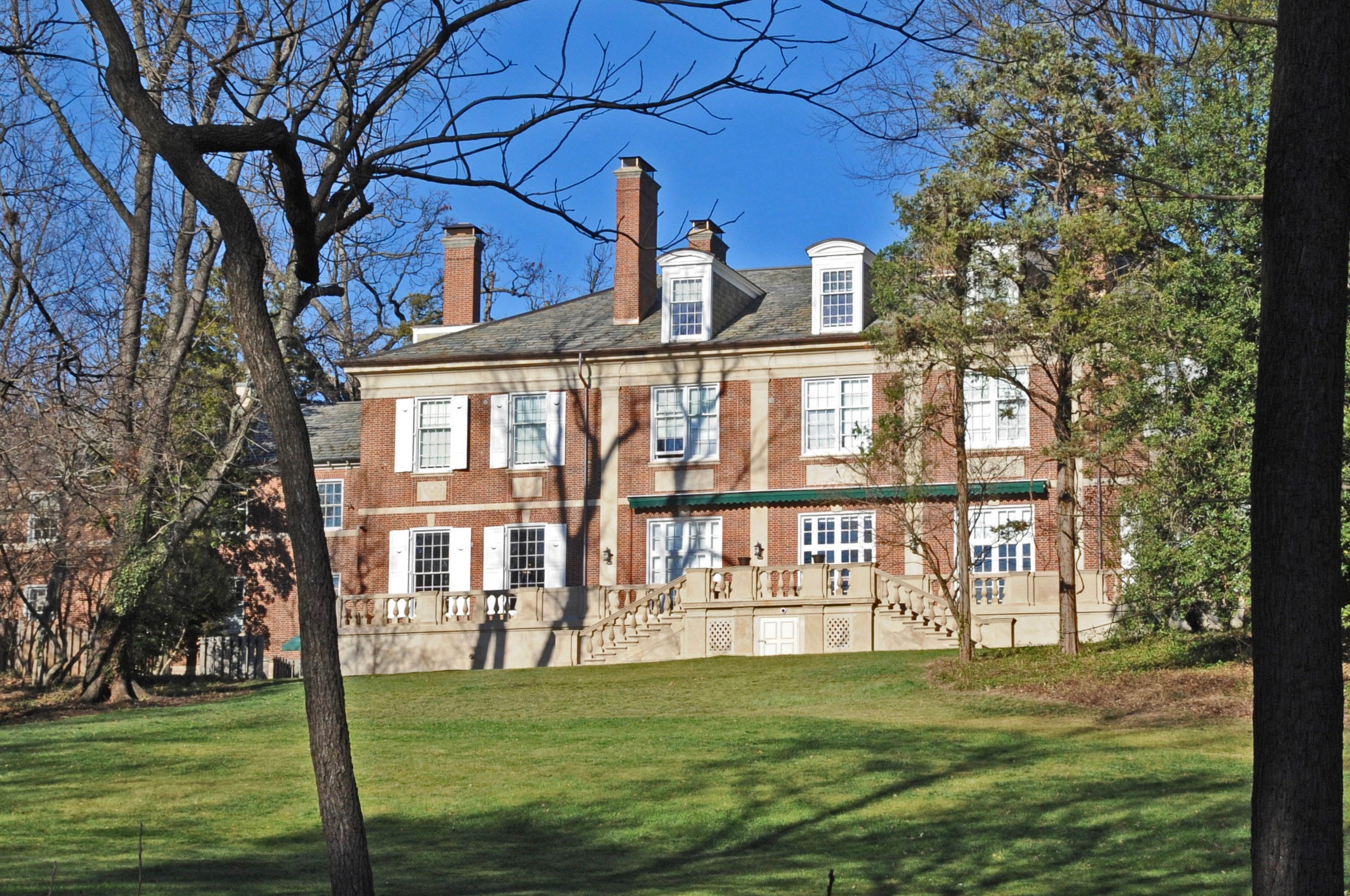

- Location within Washington, D.C.
- Location: 3029 Klingle Road, NW, Washington, D.C.
- Coordinates: 38°55′54″N 77°3′40″W
- Built: 1912
- Architect: Charles A. Platt
- Architectural style: Colonial Revival; Georgian Revival
- NRHP reference No.: 90000910
- Added to NRHP: June 28, 1990

"Tregaron Estate," formerly known as "The Causeway," is a country house and estate located in the Cleveland Park neighborhood of Northwest, Washington, D.C. The estate, built in 1912, was designed by architect Charles Adams Platt and landscape architect Ellen Biddle Shipman. The original owners, Alice and James Parmelee, lived at the estate from the time of its construction until 1940. From 1942 to 1958, it was occupied by Joseph E. Davies, who had served as United States ambassador to several countries, and his second wife, Post Cereal Company heiress Marjorie Merriweather Post. Today the estate is occupied by a campus of the Washington International School and the Tregaron Conservancy.

== Grounds ==
The estate covers 20.5 acres (83,000 m^{2}). In addition to the mansion, it includes a carriage house, greenhouse, gardener's residence, and a Russian-style dacha added by Ambassador and Mrs. Davies. The estate is notable for its varied architectural styles and landscape architecture by architect Charles A. Platt, who used the natural characteristics of the site in designing the estate. The mansion sits at the highest point of the grounds and provides views of the city to the south and the affluent Cleveland Park neighborhood to the north. Stone retaining walls line the driveway, which is carried by a large stone bridge over a small stream, "The Causeway," from which the property's original name was derived.

Tregaron
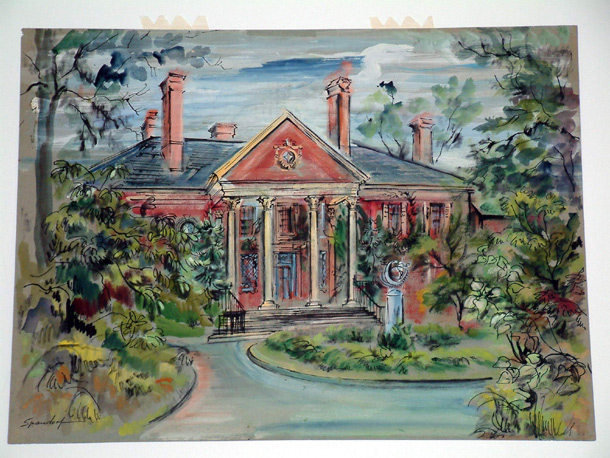
- Front View of Tregaron (1961), watercolor by Lily Spandorf.
- Interactive map of Tregaron
- Location: Washington, D.C.
- Area: 20 acres (8.1 ha)
- Website: tregaronconservancy.org

== History ==
The property, originally part of a larger estate, "Twin Oaks," was bought in 1888 by Gardiner Greene Hubbard, founder of the National Geographic Society, and named "The Causeway." His daughter Mabel married Alexander Graham Bell and inherited the property, which she sold to James Parmelee, a Cleveland financier. Parmelee hired Charles Adams Platt to design a country house for the property. Platt employed Ellen Biddle Shipman as landscape architect for the project.

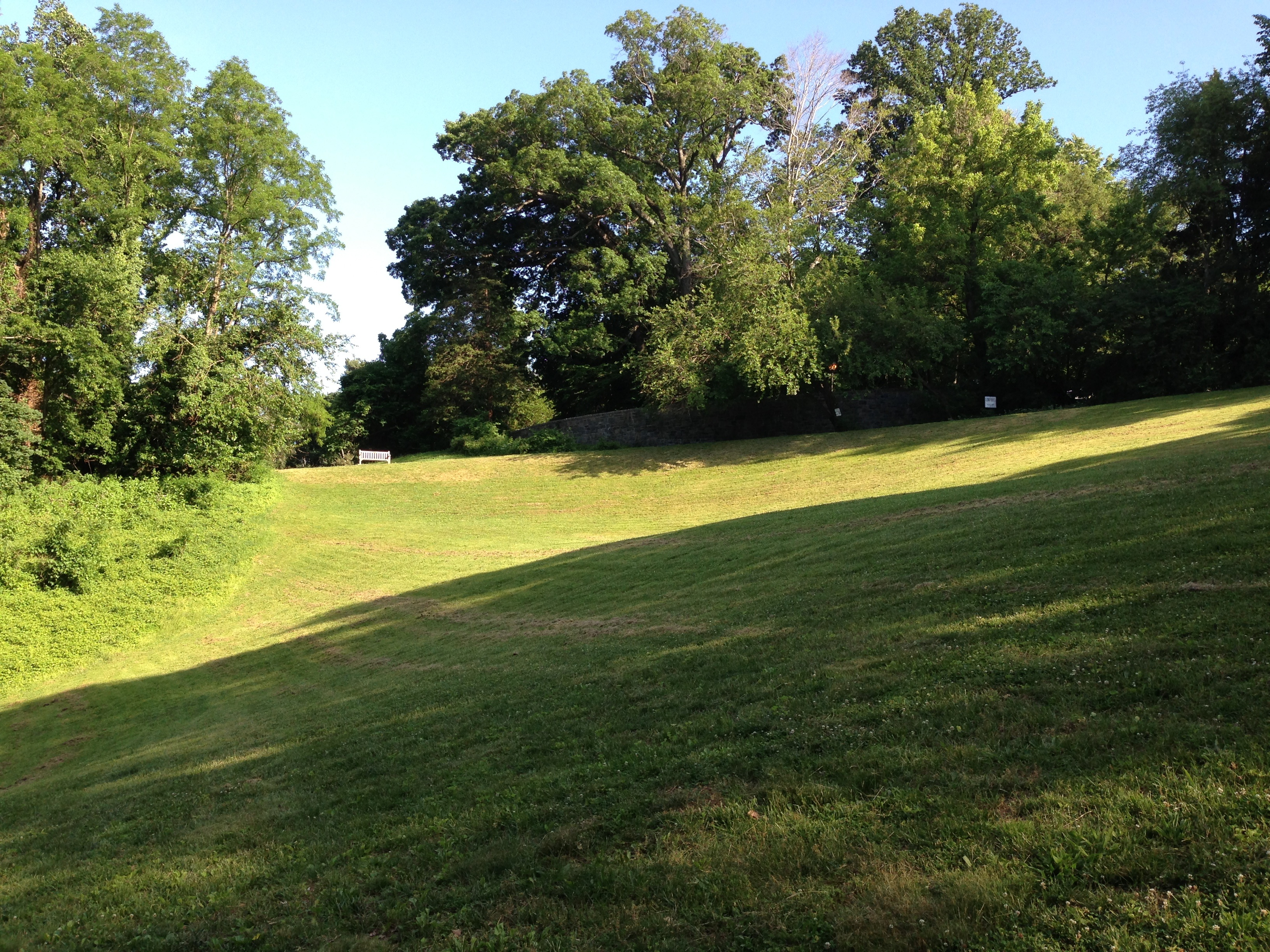
Tregaron Conservancy looking toward the upper meadow.

After Parmelee's death, the estate was purchased in 1940 by Joseph E. Davies and his wife. Davies renamed the place "Tregaron" (the town of Saint Caron) after the town where his father, Edward Davies, was born in Ceredigion, Wales.

After Davies's death in 1958, the Washington International School purchased 6 acres (24,000 m^{2}) of the 20 acres (81,000 m^{2}), and the Tregaron Limited Partnership, purchased the remaining 14 acres (57,000 m^{2}). Attempts to develop the space were opposed by the "Friends of Tregaron," a community group. In 2006, an agreement was reached whereby 13 acres (53,000 m^{2}) of the estate were to be conserved as open green space and managed by Tregaron Conservancy.

== Architecture ==
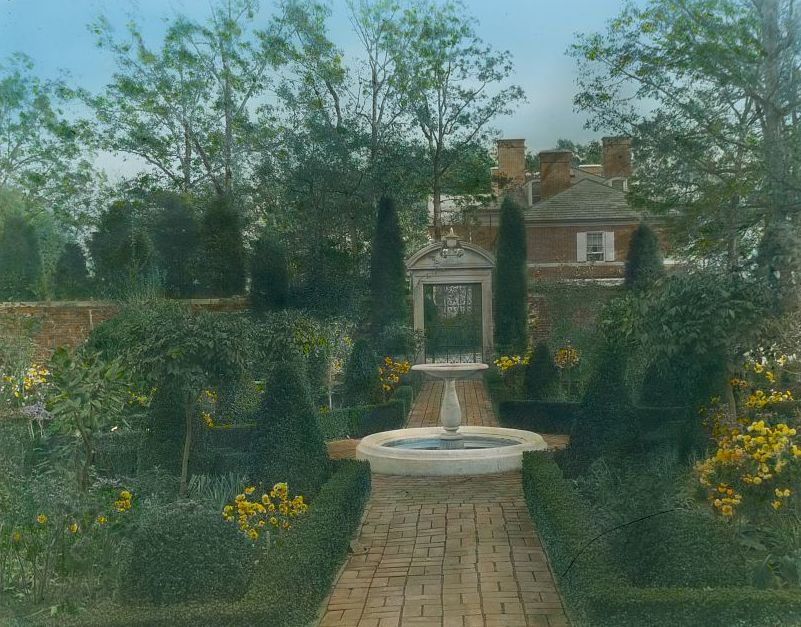
"The Causeway" James and Alice Parmelee house (1912–1940). Photo courtesy of the Library of Congress, by Francis Benjamin Johnston.

The mansion is a two-story brick building in the Georgian style. In addition to the primary central block of about 30 feet (9.1 m) by 170 feet (52 m), a one-story octagonal conservatory sits to the east, and to the west is a two-story service wing; though this wing is also two stories high, it is not as tall as the central block. Renovations undertaken in 1941 by the Davies family included small additions to the service wing and other aesthetic improvements. Further revisions in the early 1980s were undertaken in order to convert the estate into a school. The dacha, added in 1945, provides a view of Washington National Cathedral. A farmhouse dating back to 1890 sits at the edge of the estate and was converted to office space for the International School. A schoolhouse building was constructed in 1988 and was designed to complement the existing buildings.

== Filming location ==
The Tregaron Estate mansion was extensively used for both interior and exterior scenes in the 1962 film Advise and Consent and the 1993 film The Pelican Brief.

The humor coach scene in the 2006 film Borat was filmed in the Mansion (Room 205) of the Tregaron Campus. This room is usually used for Economics.

== Sources ==
National Register of Historic Places Registration Form - The Causeway (pdf), National Park Service. Retrieved September 10, 2010.
