= Twin Oaks (Washington, D.C.) =

Historic house in Washington, D.C., United States

- U.S. National Register of Historic Places
- D.C. Inventory of Historic Sites
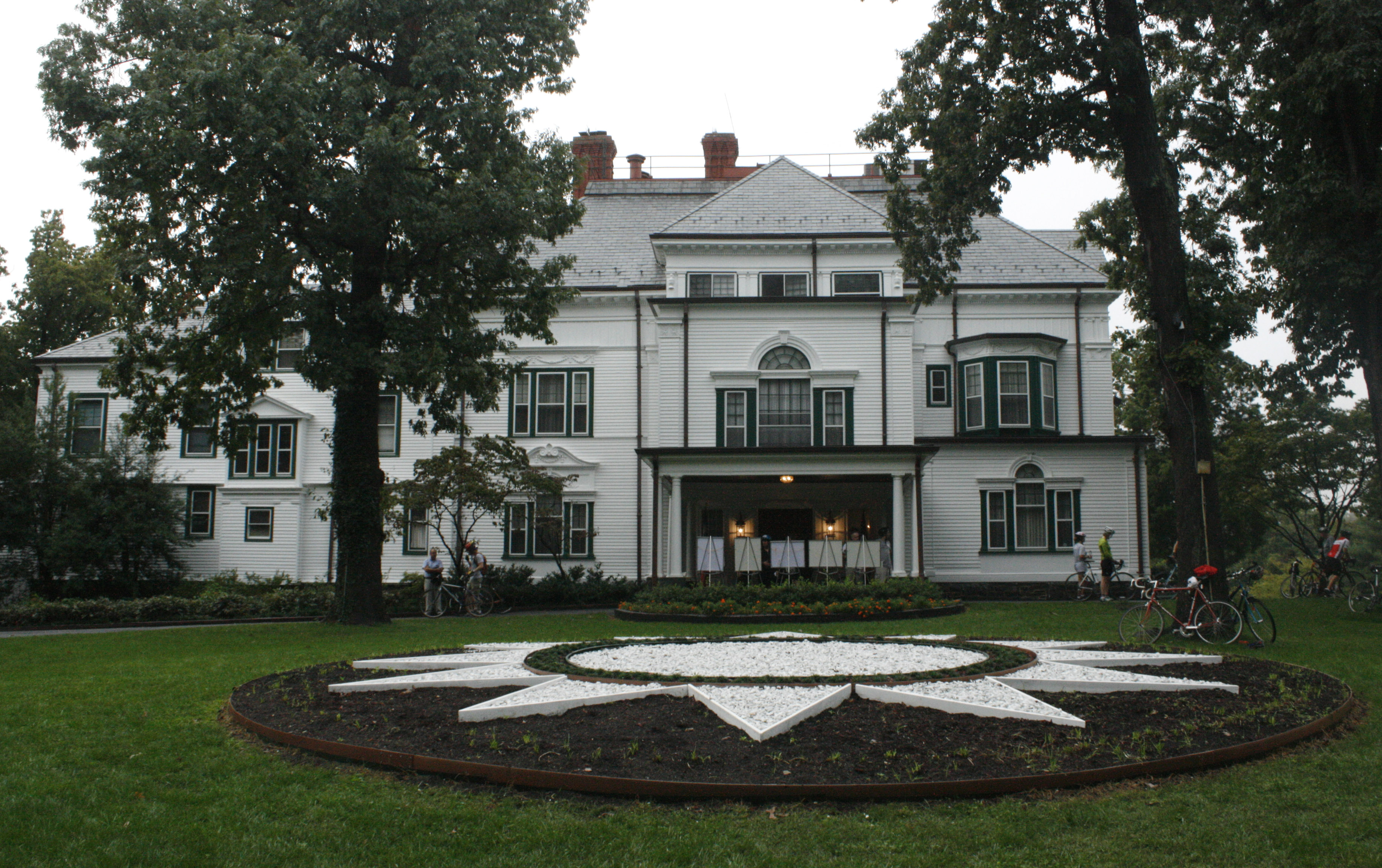
- Rear of Twin Oaks

- Location within District of Columbia
- Location: 3225 Woodley Road, NW; Washington, D.C.
- Coordinates: 38°55′54″N 77°3′50″W
- Built: 1888
- Architect: Francis Allen
- Architectural style: Colonial Revival
- NRHP reference No.: 86000153

Significant dates
- Added to NRHP: February 5, 1986
- Designated DCIHS: May 18, 1983

Twin Oaks (Chinese: 雙橡園; pinyin: Shuāng Xiàng Yuán) is a 17-acre estate located in the Cleveland Park neighborhood in Washington, D.C., United States. It was the residence of nine Republic of China ambassadors to the United States before the United States broke off diplomatic ties with the Republic of China on Taiwan in 1979. The estate is bounded by Macomb street in the north, 33rd Place NW and residences in the west, Woodley and Klingle roads in the south, and in the east by former Tregaron Estate (formerly part of Twin Oaks, now the site of the Washington International School and Tregaron Conservancy).

== Architecture ==
The historic residence, completed in 1888, was designed by Francis Allen for Gardiner Greene Hubbard, a founder and first president of the National Geographic Society and father-in-law of Alexander Graham Bell, the inventor of telephones.

== History ==
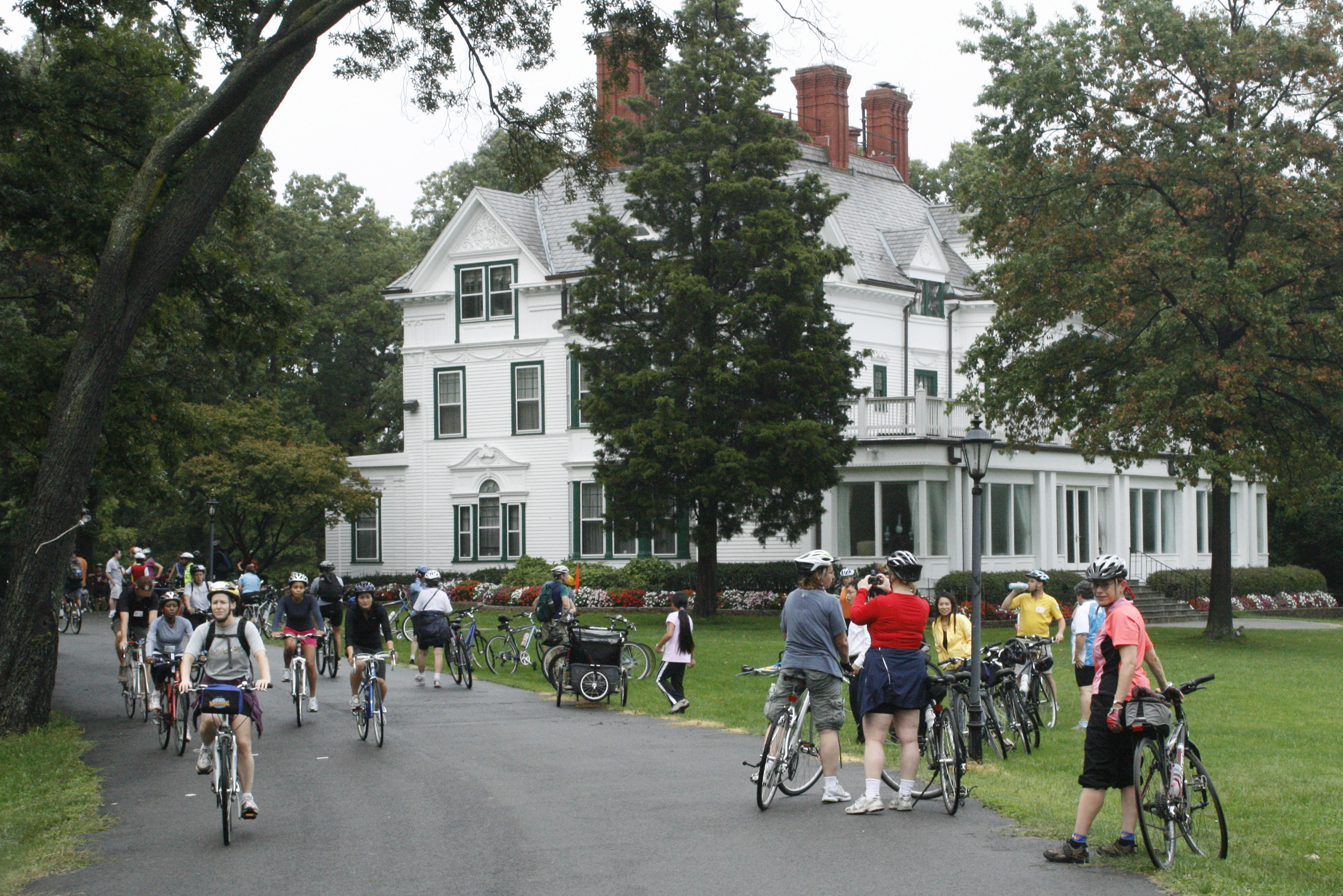
Front of Twin Oaks

Twin Oaks was listed on the District of Columbia Inventory of Historic Sites in 1983, the National Register of Historic Places in 1986, and is a contributing property in the Cleveland Park Historic District. The estate was the residence of nine Republic of China ambassadors to the United States from 1937 until 1979 when the United States switched diplomatic recognition to the People's Republic of China.

The Government of the Republic of China (Taiwan), currently represented by the Taipei Economic and Cultural Representative Office in Washington in place of an official embassy, continues to own the property and uses it for official receptions.

On 1 January 2015, the flag of the Republic of China was raised for the first time since the end of diplomatic relations in 1979. The ceremony was held by the Taipei Economic and Cultural Representative Office in the U.S., a move symbolizing significant progress in Taiwan–United States relations. Representative Shen Lyu-shun said that they not only returned, but they did it with dignity, respect and honor.

The Obama Administration's State Department spokesperson responded at the daily press briefing that "[t]he ceremony is not consistent with U.S. policy. We remain fully committed to the U.S. One China Policy, based on the Three Communiqués and the Taiwan Relations Act. No U.S. Government personnel attended the event in any capacity."

In April 2021, the Biden administration loosened restrictions on contacts between U.S. government officials and their Taiwanese counterparts. As a result, U.S. officials are now allowed to attend events at Twin Oaks, subject to certain conditions.

== See also ==
- Taiwan–United States relations
