= Woodley Park (Washington, D.C.) =

Coordinates: 38°55′42.4″N 77°3′21.5″W

- Neighborhood of Washington, D.C.
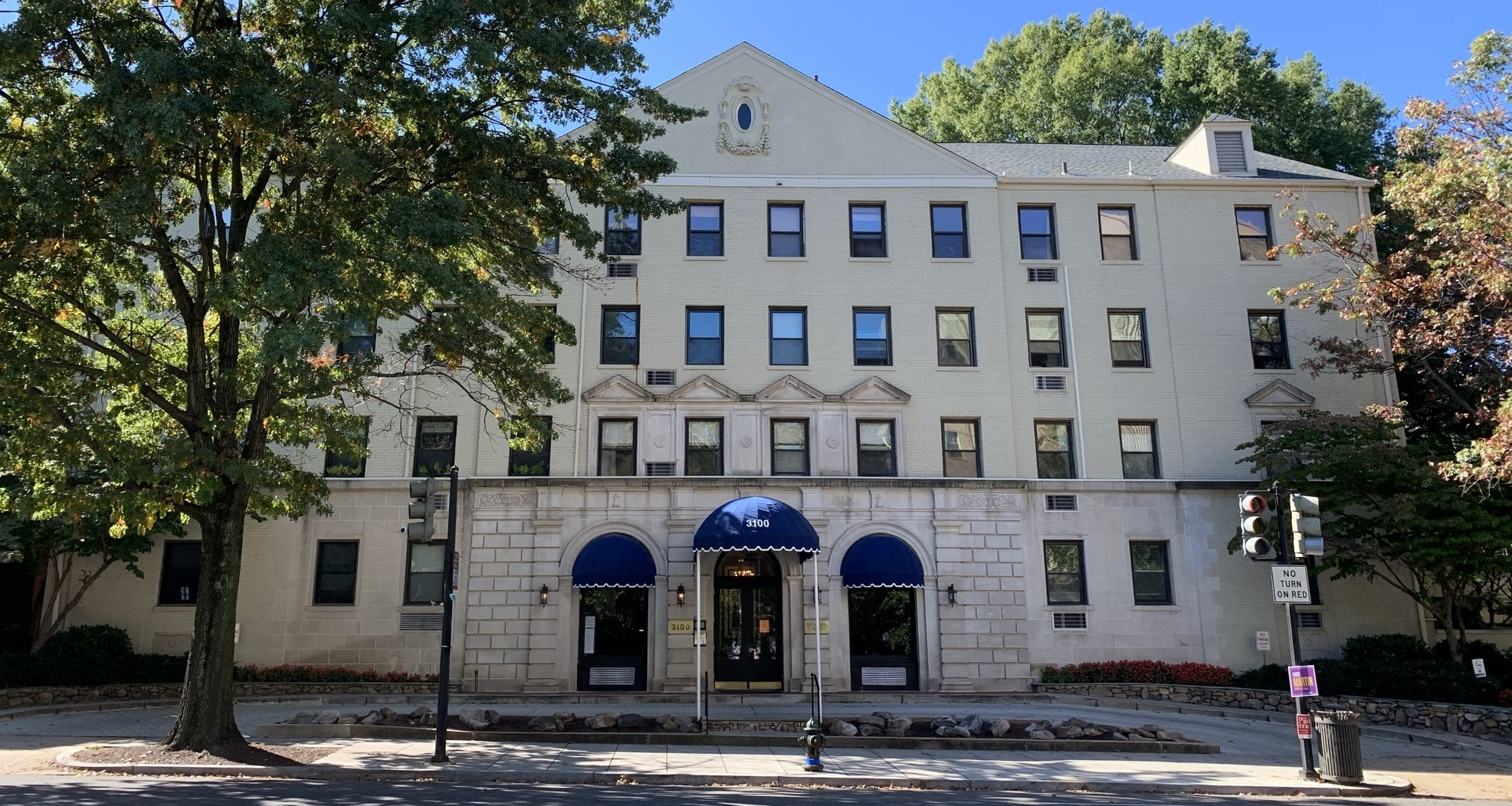
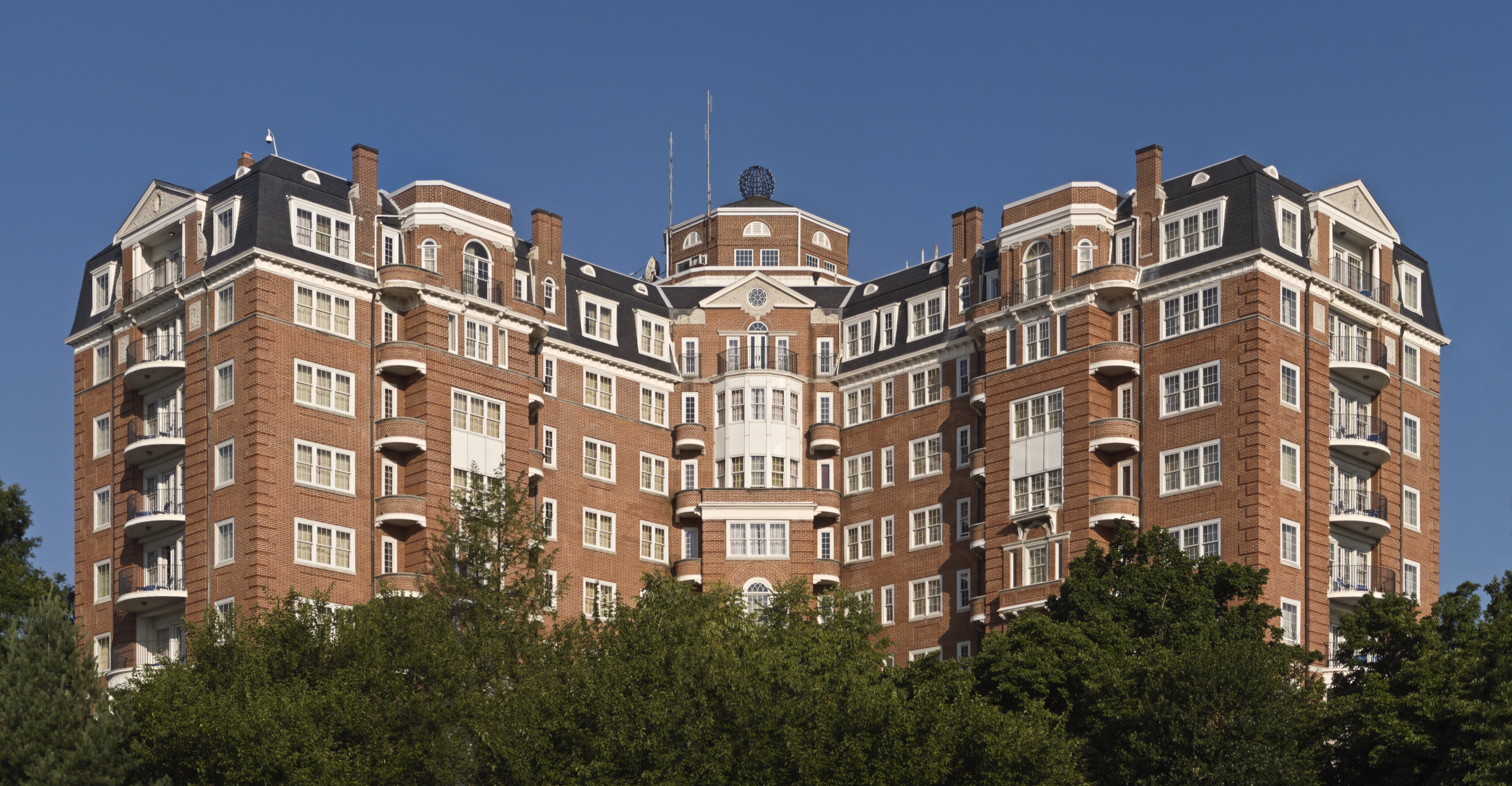
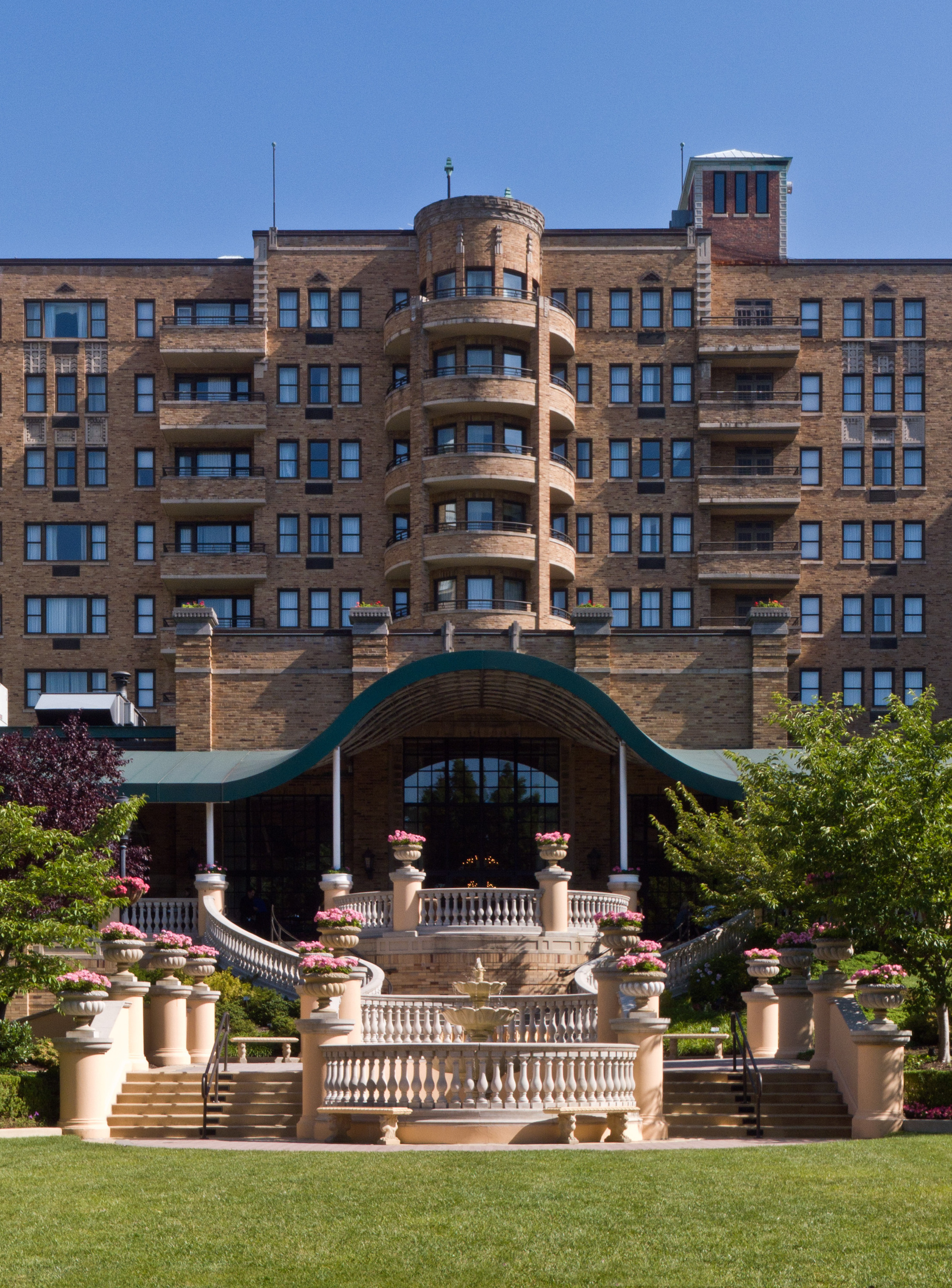
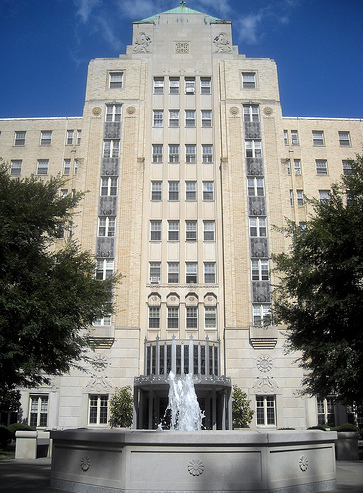
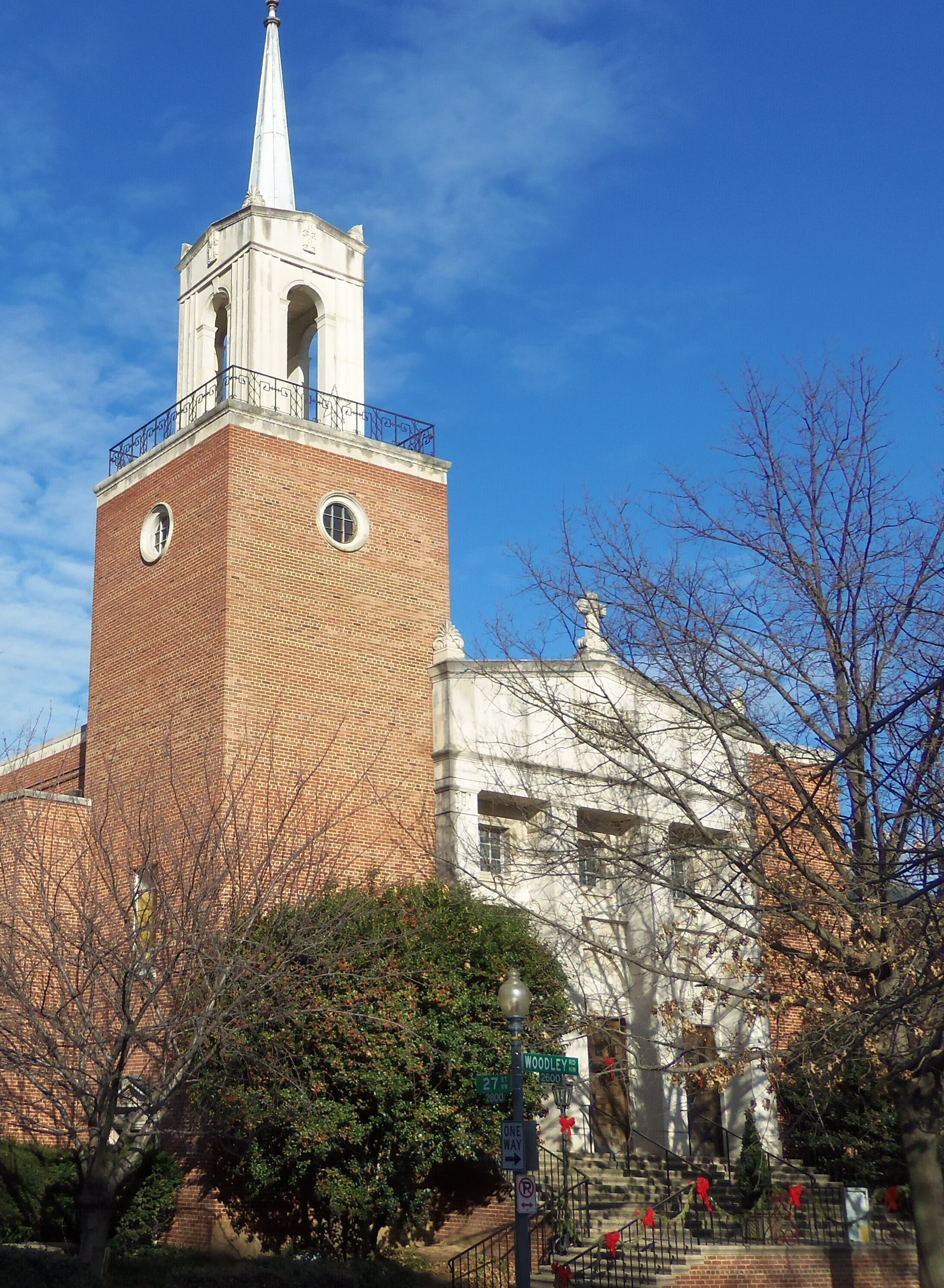
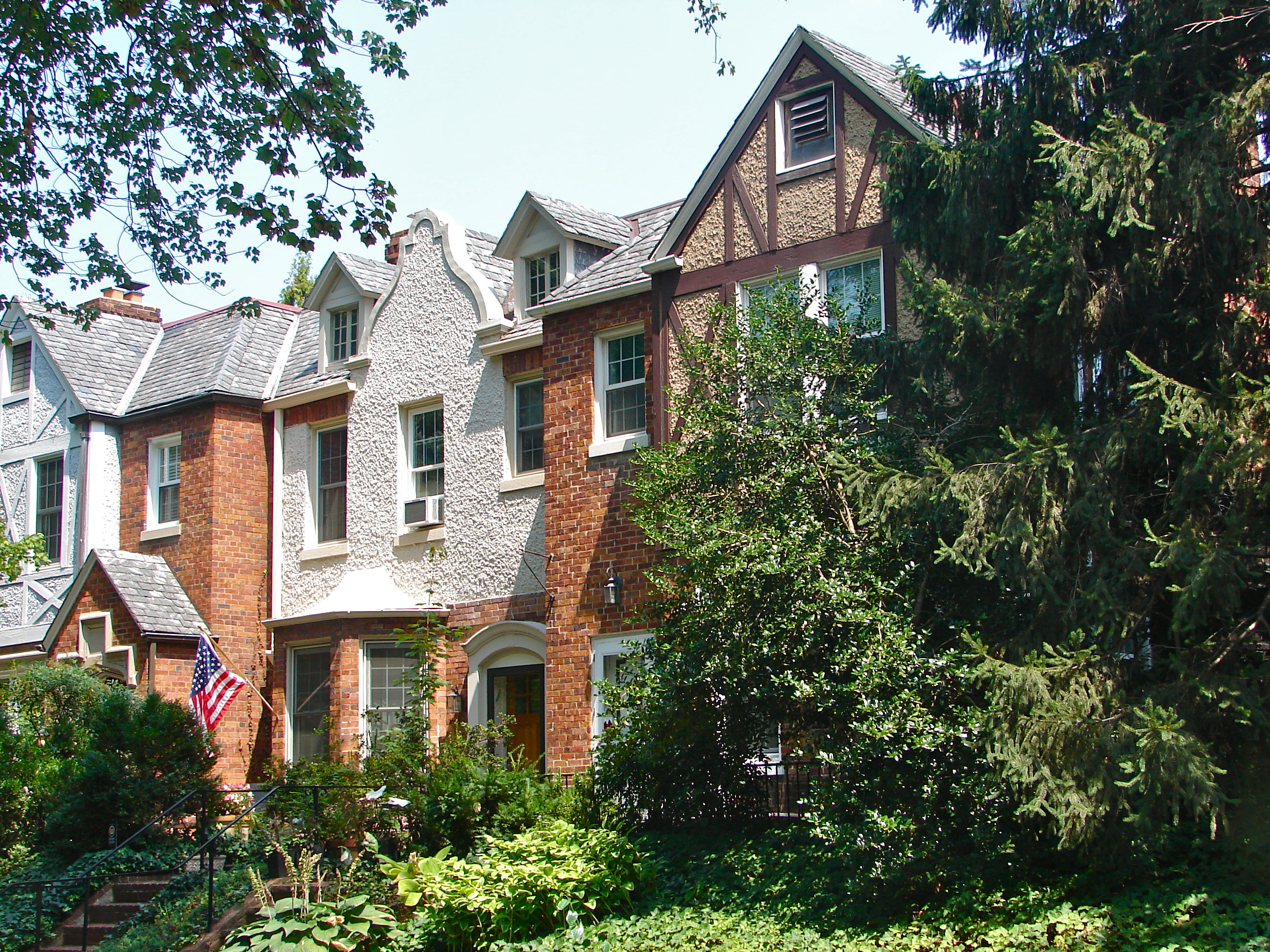
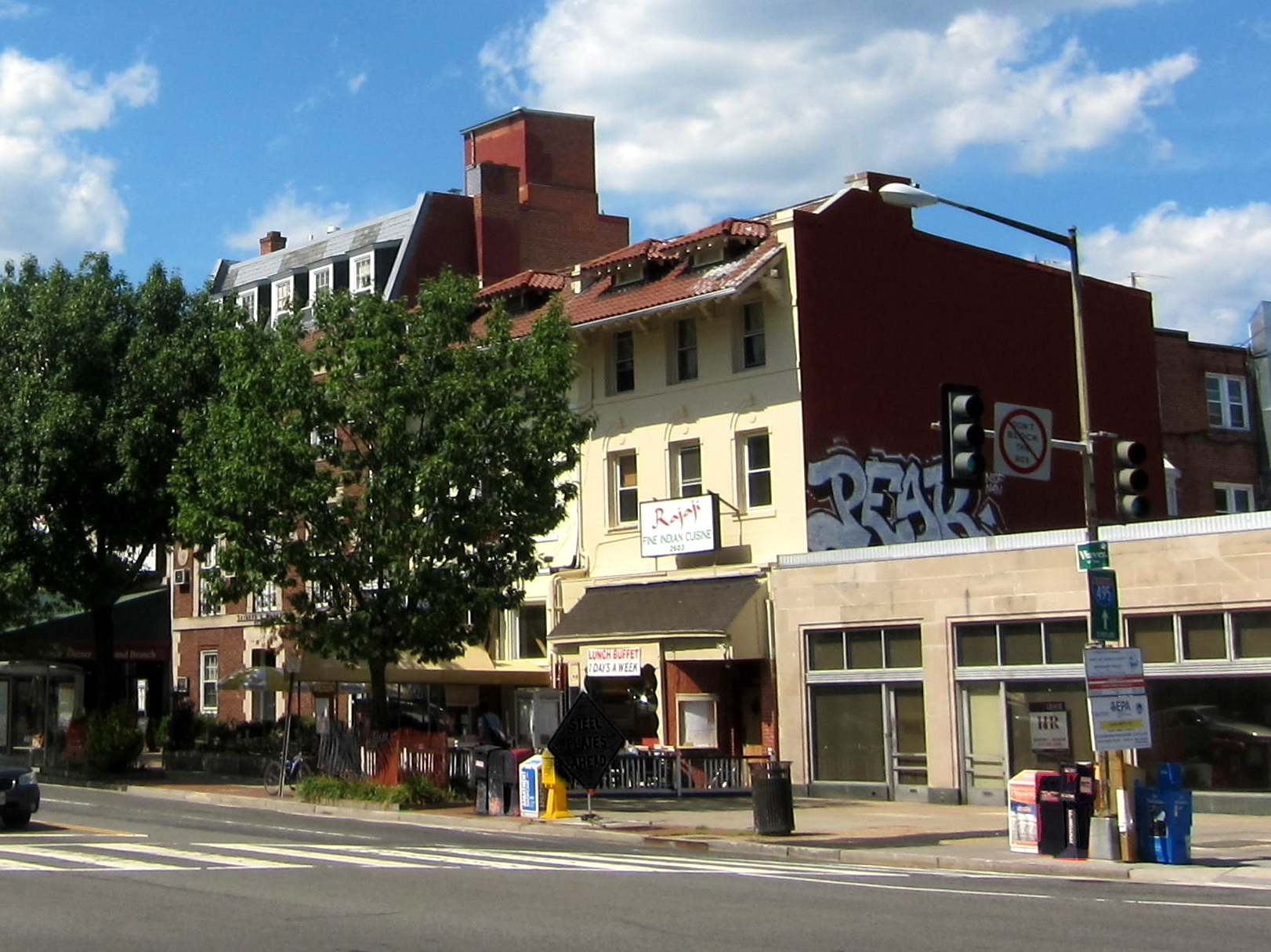
- Top: Cathedral Mansions (left) and Wardman Park Tower (right); middle: Omni Shoreham Hotel (left), Kennedy-Warren Building (center), and St. Thomas Church (right); bottom: Old Woodley Park Historic District (left) and Connecticut Avenue (right).

- Country: United States
- District: Washington, D.C.
- Quadrant: Northwest
- Ward: 3
- Postal code: ZIP Code

Woodley Park is a neighborhood in Washington, D.C., located in Northwest D.C. Primarily residential, Woodley Park hosts a commercial corridor of restaurants and shops located along Connecticut Avenue. The neighborhood is noted as the home of the National Zoological Park, part of the Smithsonian Institution.

== History ==
The area was named after Woodley House, built by Philip Barton Key (the uncle of Francis Scott Key) in 1801. Woodley has housed many political elites from President Grover Cleveland (namesake of the neighboring Cleveland Park) to World War II Secretary of War Henry Stimson. Nowadays Woodley House serves as the library and administrative building of the Maret School.

The Woodley Park Community Association was established to support the in-town neighborhood quality of life in Woodley Park.

In May 2015, the CEO and president of American Iron Works and his wife, son, and housekeeper were tortured and murdered in their Woodley Park mansion.

== Geography ==
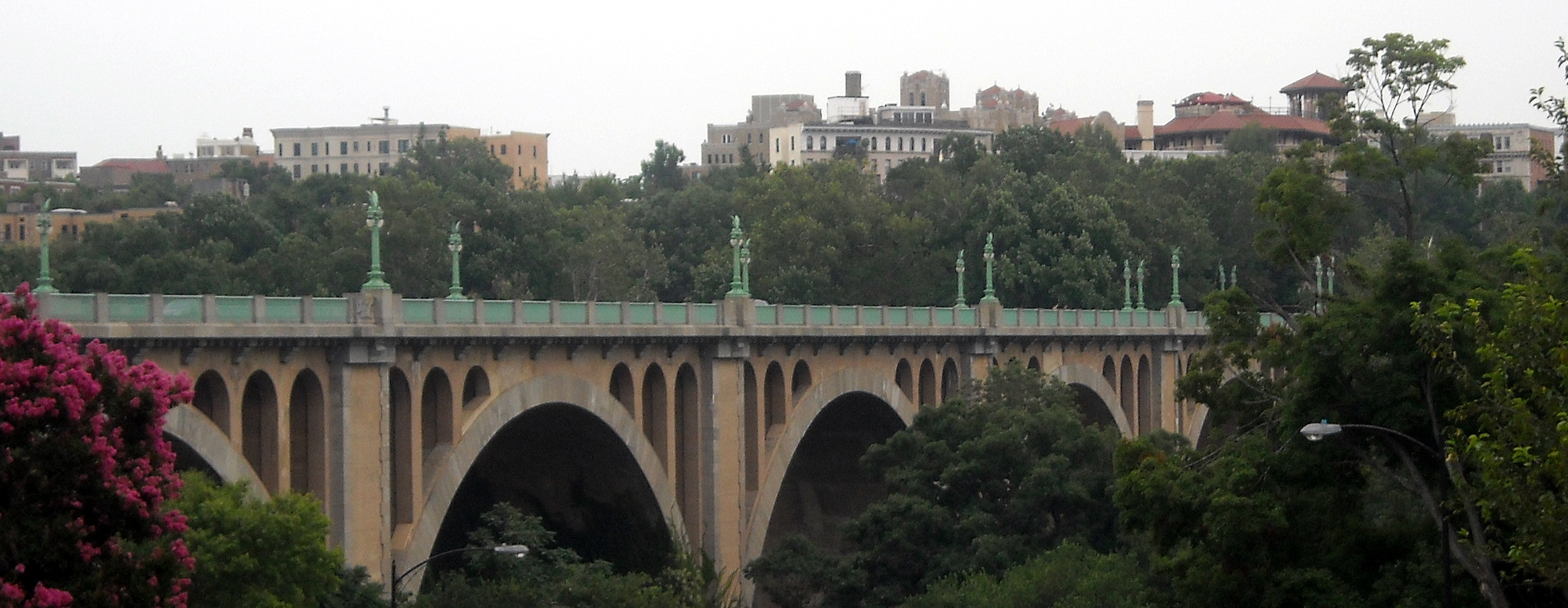
Taft Bridge connects Woodley Park to Kalorama, over Rock Creek.

It is bounded on the north by Woodley Road and Klingle Valley Trail, on the east by the National Zoo and Rock Creek Park, on the south by Calvert Street, on the southwest by Cleveland Avenue, and on the west by 34th Street.

Adjoining neighborhoods are Cleveland Park to the north, Mount Pleasant and Adams Morgan to the east, Kalorama to the south, Woodland-Normanstone Terrace to the southwest, and Massachusetts Heights to the west.

== Landmarks ==
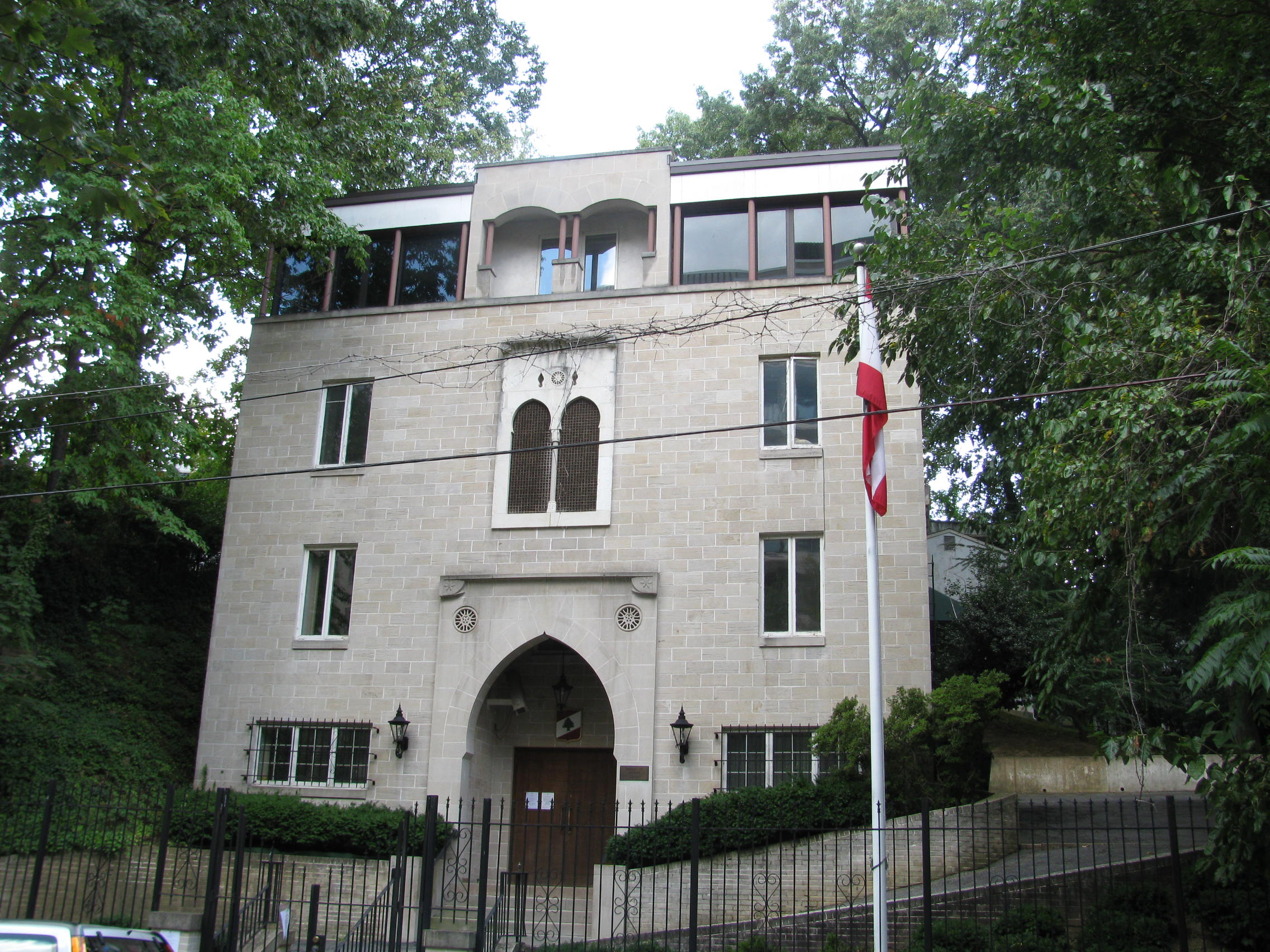
Embassy of Lebanon

- Old Woodley Park Historic District
- U.S. National Register of Historic Places
- U.S. Historic district
- Area: 54 acres (22 ha)
- Architectural style: Late 19th And 20th Century Revivals
- NRHP reference No.: 90000856
- Added to NRHP: June 15, 1990

Straddling Connecticut Avenue south of the National Zoo is a neighborhood of fine early 20th-century row houses, a throwback to the days more than a century ago when developers hoped that this wide avenue that runs northward to the Maryland border would be a boulevard lined with elegant homes. Modern-day Connecticut Avenue north of the small Woodley Park historic district, however, is now mostly filled with high rent, high rise apartment houses — although the city's height limitation restricts them to no more than eight stories, they are considered high-rise by Washington standards.

To the east, the neighborhood's curved streets overhang Rock Creek Park. On the west, they bend on the slope leading to the heights of Mt. Saint Albans, the site of Washington National Cathedral. The stately rows of meticulously designed houses are preserved intact, presenting streetscapes that have changed little for nearly a century. Though busy Connecticut Avenue is always just around the corner, the residential streets are leafy, green, and serene. The neighborhood provides access to several nature trails, including Rock Creek Park, Tregaron Conservancy, and Klingle Valley Trail.

National Zoological Park, part of the Smithsonian Institution.

On Connecticut Avenue, former row houses along the street have been converted into commercial properties, including restaurants, offices and retail shops. The Omni Shoreham Hotel is located on Calvert street. The Washington Marriott Wardman Park was demolished and is being developed into 900 residential units in two buildings as of 2025. At night, the place is a hive of activity. Shops and restaurants lining Connecticut Ave include many chains, but also many local restaurants and shops.

== Education ==
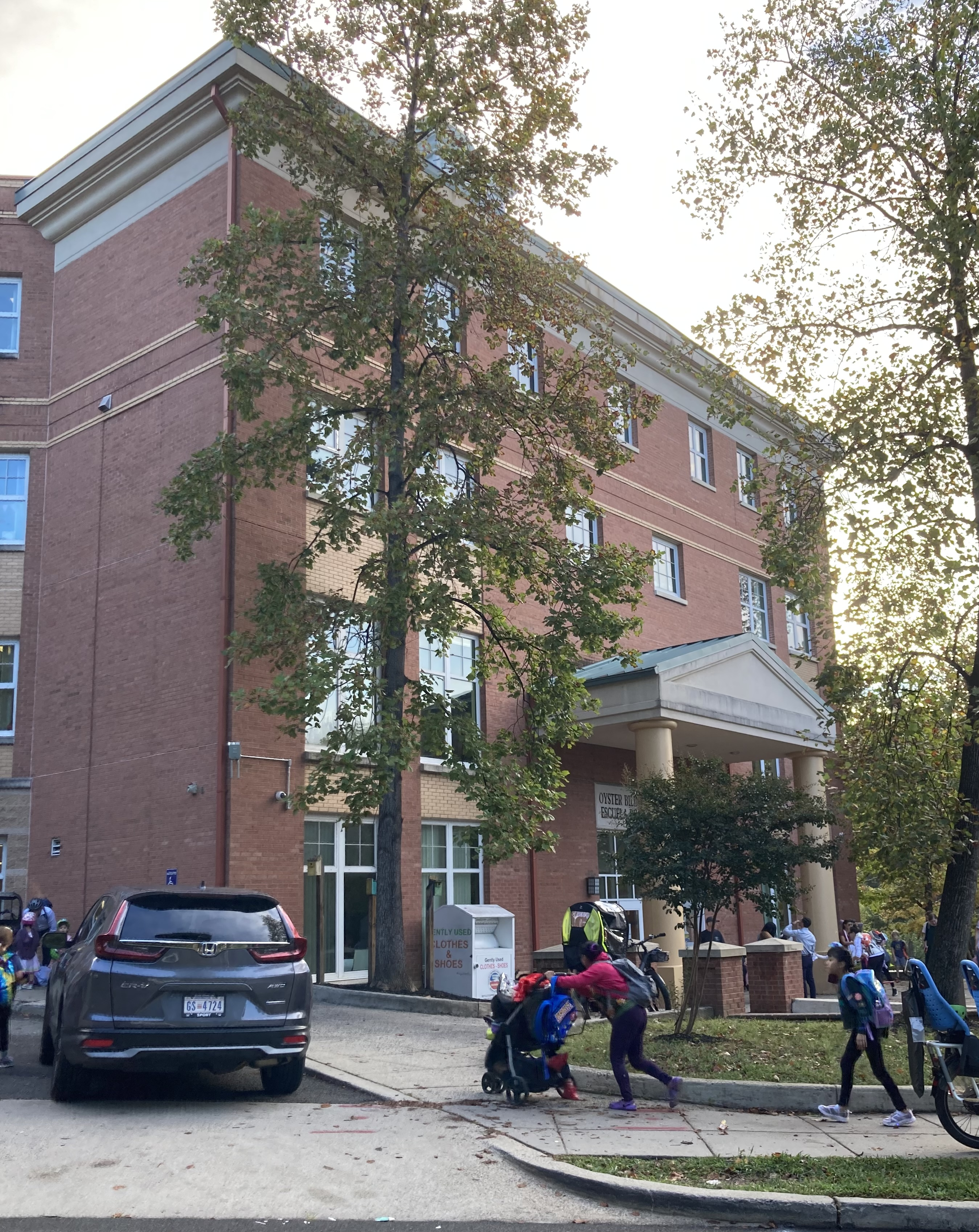
The Oyster Campus of the Oyster-Adams Bilingual School. Located on Calvert Avenue, the campus serves students in grades PK3-3rd.

The District of Columbia Public Schools is the public school system. Oyster-Adams Bilingual School is the neighborhood K-8 school, formed in 2007 by the merger of James F. Oyster Bilingual Elementary School in Woodley Park and John Quincy Adams Elementary School in Adams Morgan.

Residents are zoned to Oyster Adams, and Jackson-Reed High School.

Private schools in the neighborhood include the Maret School and Aidan Montessori School.

== Transportation ==
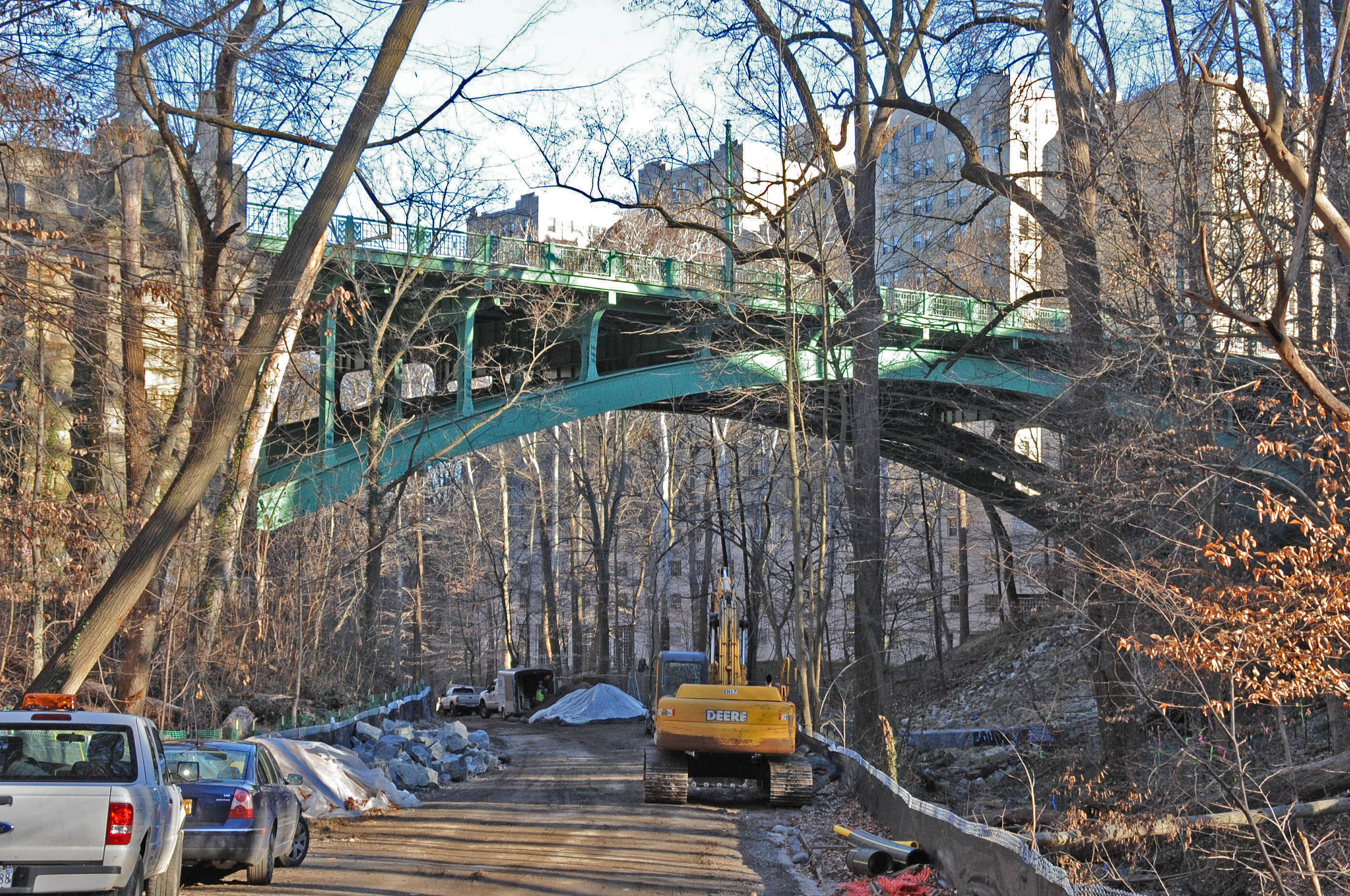
The Klingle Valley Bridge, built in 1932, connects Woodley Park to Cleveland Park over Klingle Valley

Woodley Park is served by the Woodley Park-Zoo/Adams Morgan Metro station, between Dupont Circle and Cleveland Park on the Red Line.
