= Cathedral Mansions Apartment Buildings =

- U.S. National Register of Historic Places
- D.C. Inventory of Historic Sites
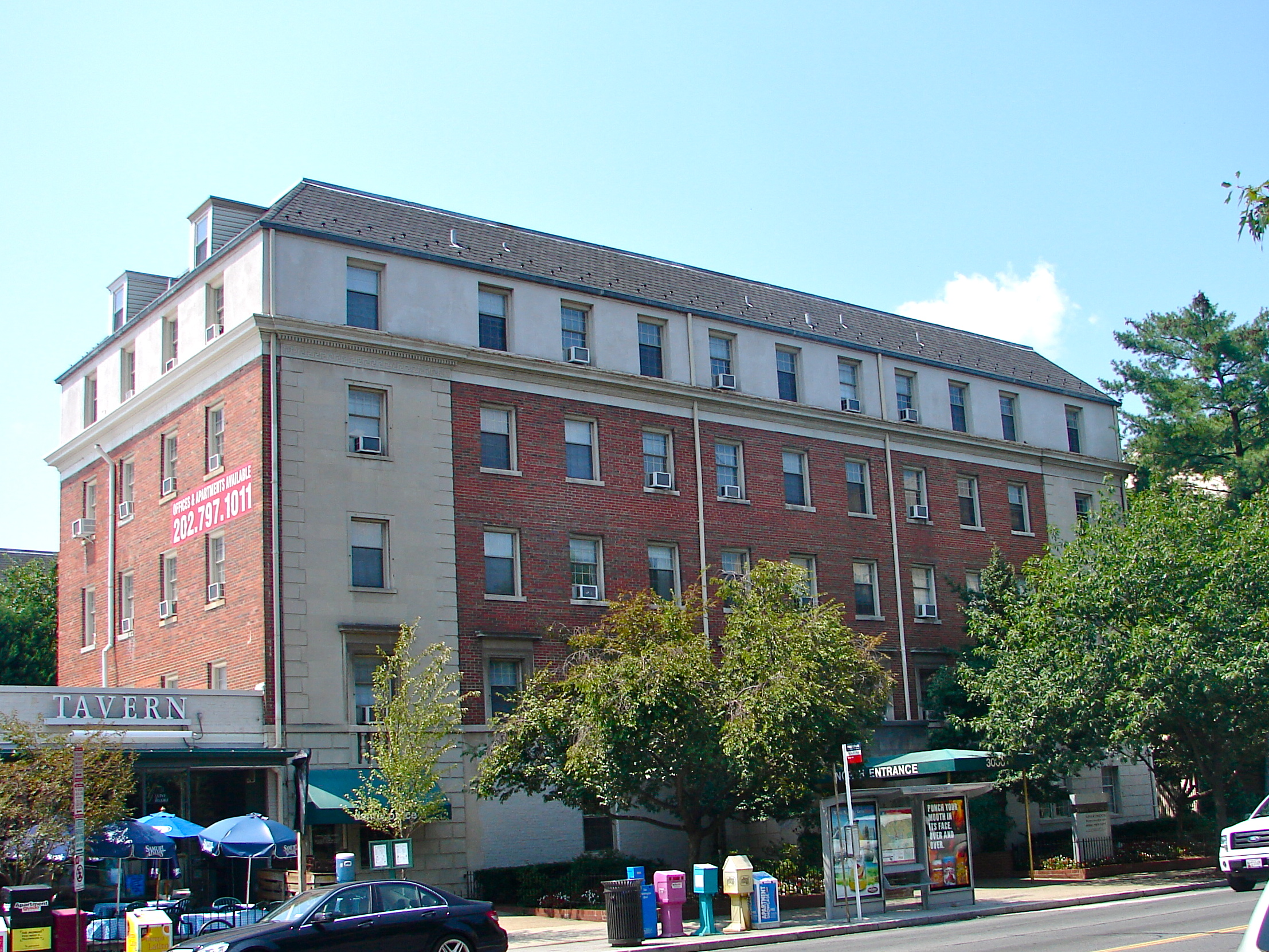
- 3000 Connecticut Avenue

- Location within Washington, D.C.
- Location: 2900, 3000, and 3100 Connecticut Avenue NW; Washington, D.C.
- Coordinates: 38°55′48″N 77°3′21″W
- Built: 1922-1925
- Architect: Eugene Waggaman; Harry Wardman; Mihran Mesrobian
- Architectural style: Classical Revival
- MPS: Apartment Buildings in Washington, DC, MPS
- NRHP reference No.: 94001037

Significant dates
- Added to NRHP: September 9, 1994
- Designated DCIHS: May 17, 1989

The Cathedral Mansions Apartment Buildings are historic structures located at 2900, 3000, and 3100 Connecticut Avenue NW in the Woodley Park neighborhood of Washington, D.C. Constructed from 1922 to 1924, architect Eugene Waggaman designed the Connecticut Avenue apartment buildings in the Classical Revival style for developer Harry Wardman. Architect Mihran Mesrobian's initials appear on a drawing for one of the buildings.

The buildings were added to the District of Columbia Inventory of Historic Sites on May 17, 1989, and listed on the National Register of Historic Places on September 9, 1994.

== See also ==
- National Register of Historic Places listings in Washington, D.C.
