= Tregaron Conservancy =

Historic woodland garden in Washington, D.C., U.S.

- Interactive map of Tregaron Conservancy
- Type: historic woodland garden
- Location: Washington, D.C.
- Coordinates: 38°55′57″N 77°03′36″W
- Area: 13 acres (5.3 ha)
- Created: 2006
- Open: dawn to dusk
- Status: open year round
- Water: lily pond, Klingle stream, Macomb stream
- Threatened by: development (1980-2006, 2015-2020)
- Parking: street parking on Macomb and Klingle Road NW
- Public transit: Red Line Cleveland Park station
- Website: www.tregaron.org

- Tregaron, The Causeway
- U.S. National Register of Historic Places
- D.C. Inventory of Historic Sites
- Location: 3029 Klingle Road, NW, Washington, D.C.
- Area: 20.5
- Built: 1912
- Architect: Charles A. Platt, Ellen Biddle Shipman
- Architectural style: Colonial Revival; Georgian Revival
- Restored: 2009
- NRHP reference No.: 90000910

Significant dates
- Added to NRHP: June 28, 1990
- Designated DCIHS: January 5, 1979

The Tregaron Conservancy is a 13-acre privately owned and managed historic woodland garden nature park in Northwest, Washington, D.C. and the nonprofit organization that manages it. It is an urban green space in Cleveland Park, bounded in the north by Macomb Stream and private residences, in the south and east by the Klingle Valley Trail which connects to Rock Creek Park, and to the west by the Washington International School and Twin Oaks estate.

The conservancy is part of former Tregaron Estate, which was formerly part of the neighboring estate Twin Oaks. Landscape architect Ellen Biddle Shipman, designed a "wilderness garden, with streams and bridges and paths, and native plants and dappled sunshine" planted with specimens that mimic the natural surroundings. An heir to the estate recollected the grounds as "masses of daffodils in the spring and masses of azaleas and a little babbling brook and arched bridges under which I'm sure trolls lived."

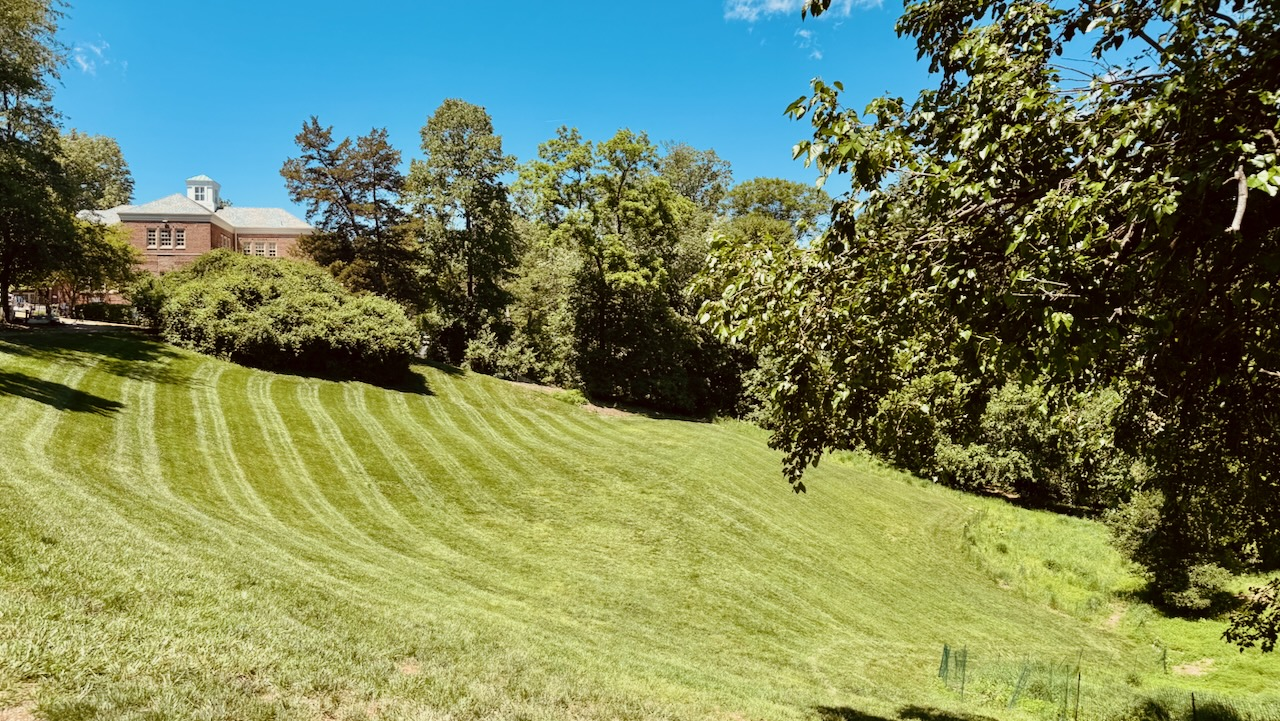
North meadow

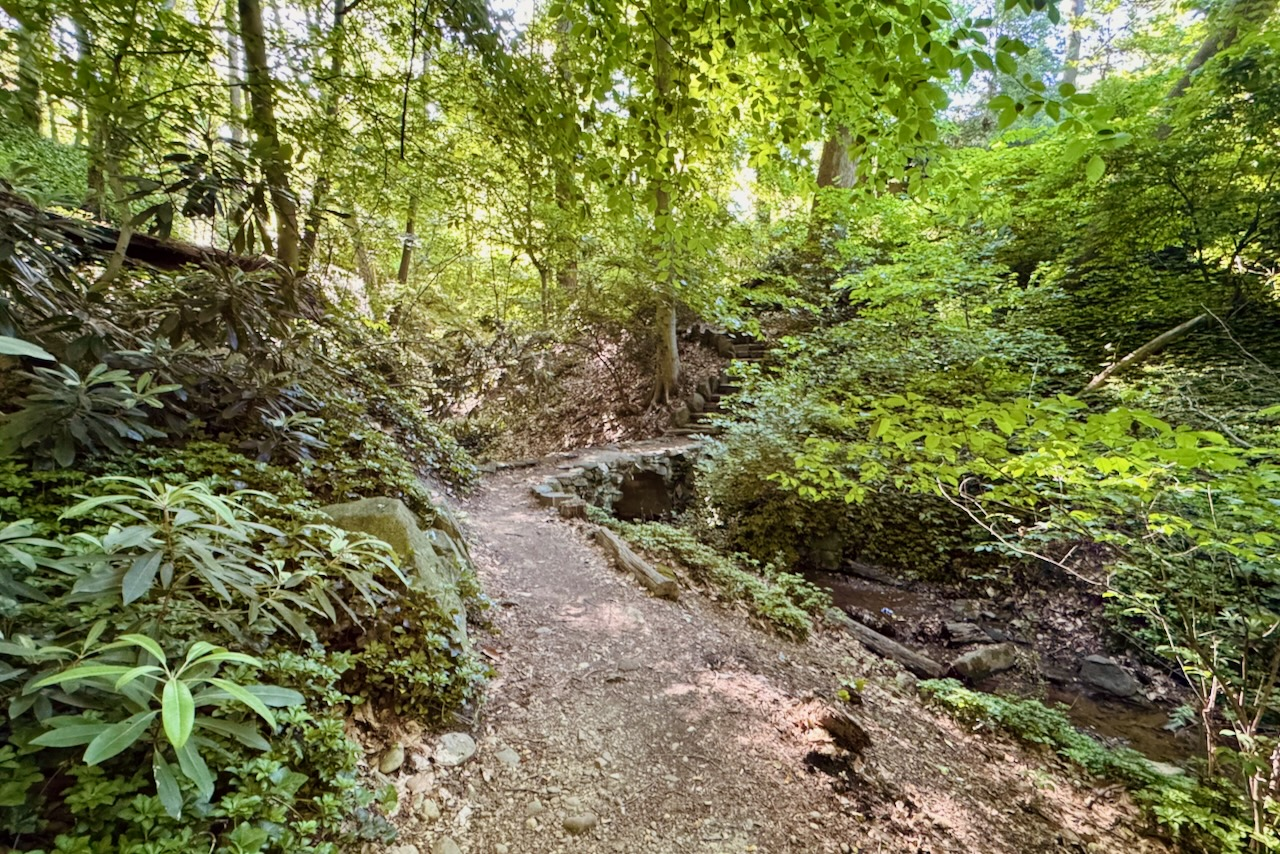
Macomb stream and trail

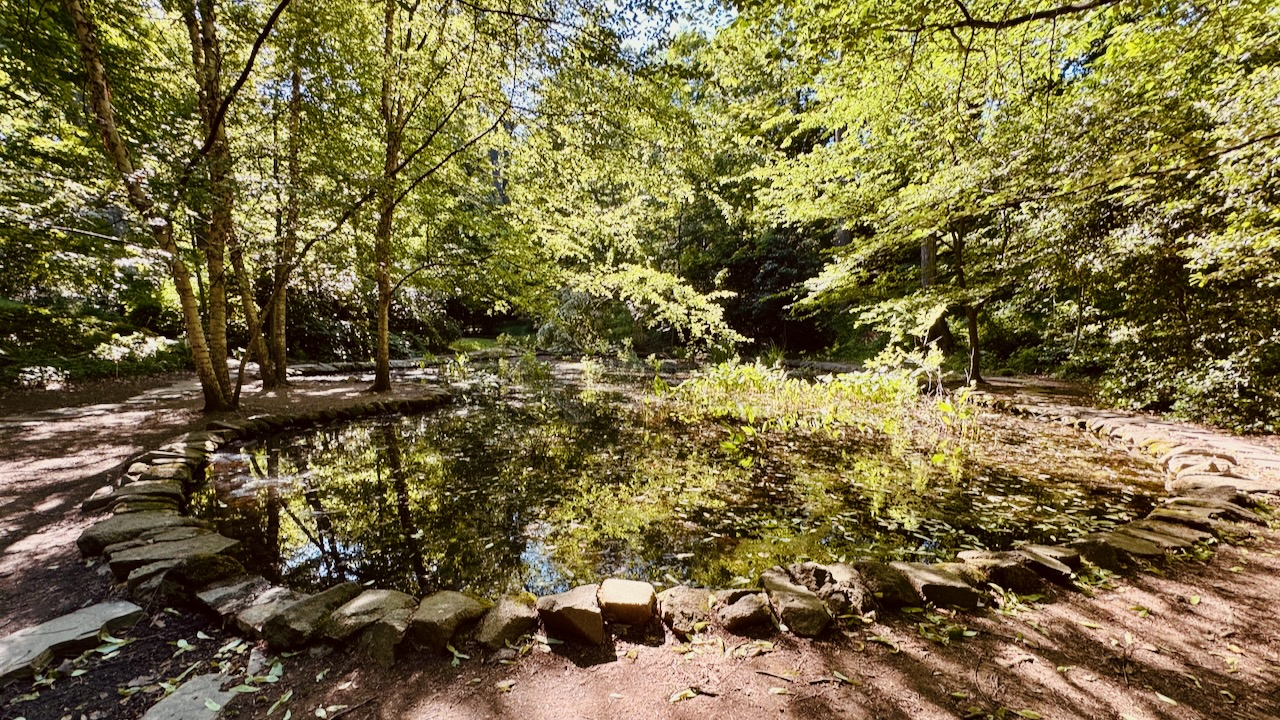
Lily pond

The cultural landscape report for Tregaron identified 6 distinct landscaping regions designed by Shipman:

- Cow Pasture & Oak - a meadow south of the Klingle stream, on the southwest corner of the conservancy
- Causeway & Pond Valley - containing Klingle stream running from Twin Oaks in the east into the lily pond and westward until it passes under the Klingle Valley Trail
- Drive and Meadows - the driveway running from Macomb to Klingle Valley roads and two adjacent meadows, a sloped one to the north and a flat one to the east
- Northeast Woodland, Stream and Trails - containing Macomb stream, forested hills, and paths connecting the Drive and Meadows to Causeway & Pond Valley
- Macomb Entry & Woodland Slope - wooded hill between the Macomb entrance and Hilltop, Gardens & House (the slope is not open to the public, but access is allowed via the road)
- Hilltop, Gardens & House - on the west end of the property (Not part of the conservancy. Owned and managed by the Washington International School.)

The conservancy hosts a diverse calendar of events, including tours of the conservancy, including ones focused on the site's history, geology, birds, trees, as well as concerts, forrest bathing, Tai Chi, an Easter Egg hunt, and a discussion group for descendants of Holocaust survivors. The conservancy has formed volunteer partnerships with the Washington International School and a local gardening group.

== History ==
=== Inheritance squabbles ===
After the death of owner Joseph E. Davies in 1958, the grounds "were neglected and fell into disrepair" and overgrowth. But sale of the property was frustrated by Davies's "enormously complex" ownership of the property, which left "different heirs owning different parts of the property and sharing other parts" and the participation of heirs' spouses for any contract selling the property.

The Washington International School began renting the estate's buildings in 1972 after an unsuccessful attempt to purchase the property, and although there were other offers to purchase the property, the six heirs could not agree. After "years of internecine warfare among Davies's heirs," the D.C. Superior Court appointed a trustee to sell the estate. Davies' heirs declined a "$4.5 million bid from New York developer Louis Marx Jr., heir to a toy manufacturing fortune, and a $4 million offer from a Belgian count." In 1978, the Washington International School made a failed $3.7 million offer. Because the school only had $2.5 million for the purchase, it sought a developer to buy eight acres of the undeveloped areas and "build 48 town houses on it." In January 1979, the school removed 10-12 trees ("oaks, poplar, fir trees, holly") to clear half an acre for a soccer field, but had hoped to clear more. Davies's daughter Emlen Davies Evers flew to Washington D.C. to confront the bulldozer personally, standing in the mud dressed in a mink coat, stating that the school was "renting this property. They have no right to desecrate it." The school agreed to halt work so the controversy could be resolved. That same month, Tregaron was added to the District of Columbia Inventory of Historic Sites. The property was zoned for single family detached residences on one-sixth acre lots, so the school indicated its willingness to accommodate a developer by making purchase contingent on a zoning change to allow denser development of town homes. If the developer could not zone the property within two years the school would buy the property back.

But obstacles to development emerged immediately. Real estate developers at the time casts doubts about development because of the steep terrain and "vocal opposition from the Cleveland Park Citizens Association, which represents the tight-knit community of professionals who live in $200,00 turn-of-the-century homes and highly value the Tregaron greenery." Real estate developers Rozansky and Kay abandoned their plan to develop the property because they "could not economically build single-family houses on the tract without completely destroying the whole tract by grading it, leveling in and cutting down every single tree on it."

=== Sale and development plans ===
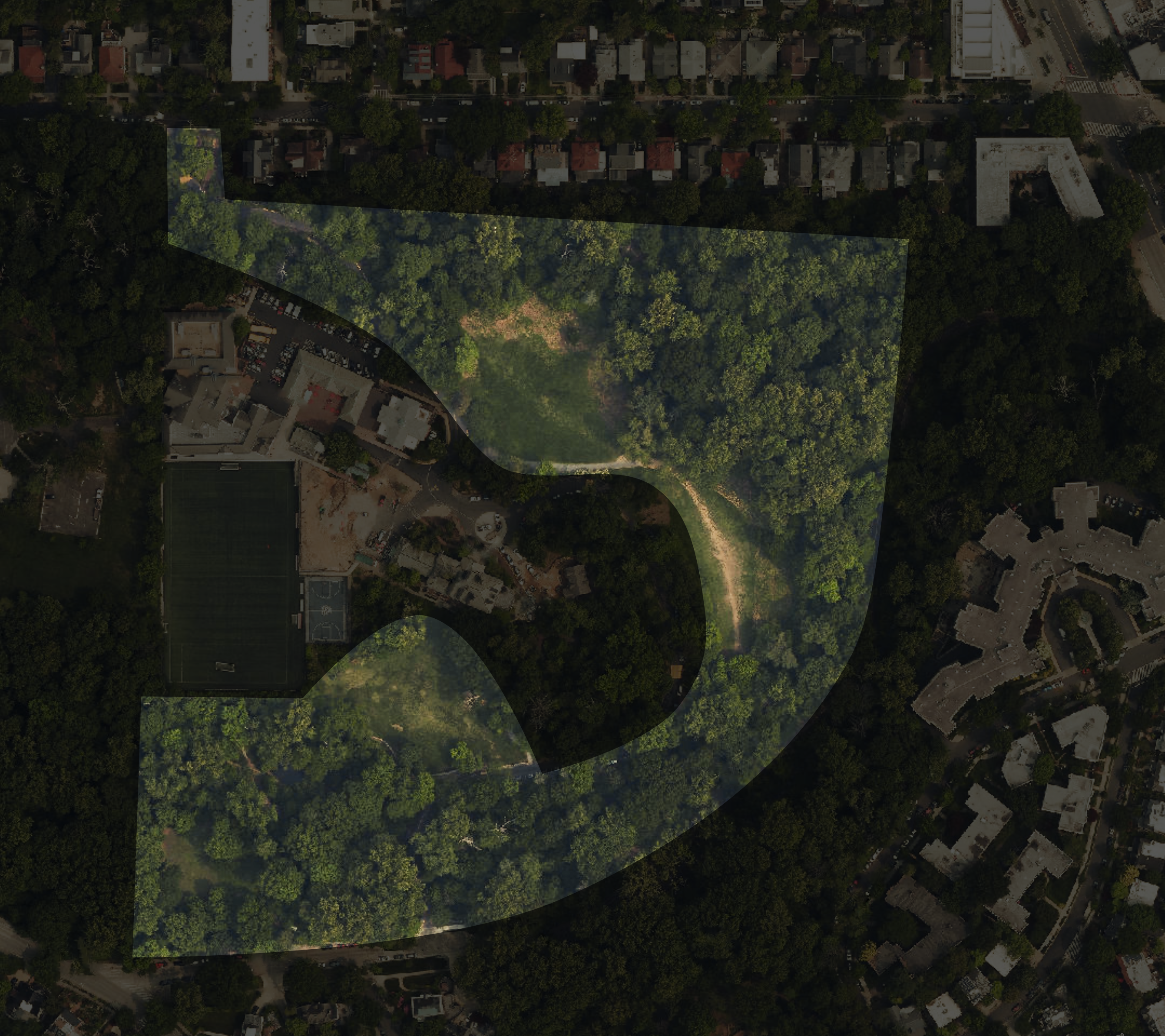
Tregaron Conservancy aerial photo

In June 1980, after years of squabbling between heirs and legal battles, a D.C. Superior Court ordered sale of the property to the Washington International School and developers. The Washington International School bought the buildings and associated grounds on the west side of the property while 14 acres of undeveloped land on the south and east were purchased by Tregaron Limited Partnership. The developers behind the partnership were Alan R. Novak of Washington and Raymond A. Lamontagne of Wilton, Conn, two lawyers with a history of real estate development work, and Louis Marx Jr., who had previously made a failed bid for the property. Faced with early criticism of development by locals, an attorney for the developer stated "We're not interested in a fight." The ensuing fight over the development of Tregaron would last 25 years.

In the May 1981, the predecessor to District of Columbia's Historic Preservation Review Board unanimously rejected the developers plans to build 180 town homes, finding that they would "dramatically and negatively alter" the site and recommended a reduction in density for future proposals. The developer's lawyers indicated that they intended to reduce the plan to 135 units. Friends of Tregaron, a group of local activists opposed to the plan praised the decision.

In September 1982, the National Capital Planning Commission rejected the developer's further scaled back plans for 120 town homes. The developer's attorney dismissed the decision as "quirky, ‘novel' opinions of ‘two quasi-federal agencies whose opinions are only advisory,'" and speculated that they would "be granted almost exactly the [variance] we've requested." Friends of Tregaron countered that 60 to 70 units was more appropriate for the site, and were joined by other opponents from the neighboring Woodley Park Towers Condominium Association, the Committee of 100 on the Federal City, and the Advisory Neighborhood Commission 3C. In November 1982, 140 residents attended a D.C. Zoning Commission meeting opposing the developer's plan for a zoning variance to fit more units on the site that would otherwise be allowed by zoning law. An attorney for the developers dismissed the criticism, stating "This is not just an exercise -- we're not playing games here. No one would have spent three years and hired the best architects and consultants . . . unless they were planning to go ahead." In January 1983, the D.C. Zoning Commission sided with residents and unanimously rejected the developer's plan.

=== Outside investors attract scrutiny ===
In November 1982, Novak and Lamontagne "were forced to seek out additional investors." Lamontagne sold a 13% interest to Wood River Capital Corp., while Novak sold a 37% interest to Catopale Investment N.V., which held an option to buy a 62% interest in the venture. Just weeks later, the D.C. Zoning Commission and neighborhood activists pressed for a more complete disclosure of the partnership's members. Critics were worried that the corporation was "merely fronting for the real interests, with no equity at risk of their own, as they protect the offshore investors from legal liability and public disclosure," and expressed concern about its "experience and financial capacity to deliver on this plan." Novak declined to disclose details of the company.

Although Catopale Investment N.V. was organized in the Netherlands Antilles under a corporate structure which allows investors to remain anonymous, an attorney for Israeli billionaire Shaul Eisenberg confirmed in November 1982 that Eisenberg was behind Catopale. When the partnership finally donated its remaining land to the conservancy in 2015, a plaque was dedicated in "S. N. Eisenberg."

A House Committee investigation later reported that Wood River Capital Corp. was controlled by Novak and Lamontagne's partner Louis Marx Jr., a friend of George H.W. Bush, whose son Neil Bush "invested less than $3,000 in an energy firm that paid him a $160,000 annual salary for nearly two years, while two venture capital firms lost $2.3 million of federally guaranteed investments in the company." Wood River Capital Corp. ultimately went into liquidation and owed the Small Business Administration $29.3 million, in what was referred to by a committee member as "a shameful abuse of a small-business assistance program" and added: "a $2.3-million embarrassment" where "taxpayers may end up with the bill."

=== Resolution and restoration ===
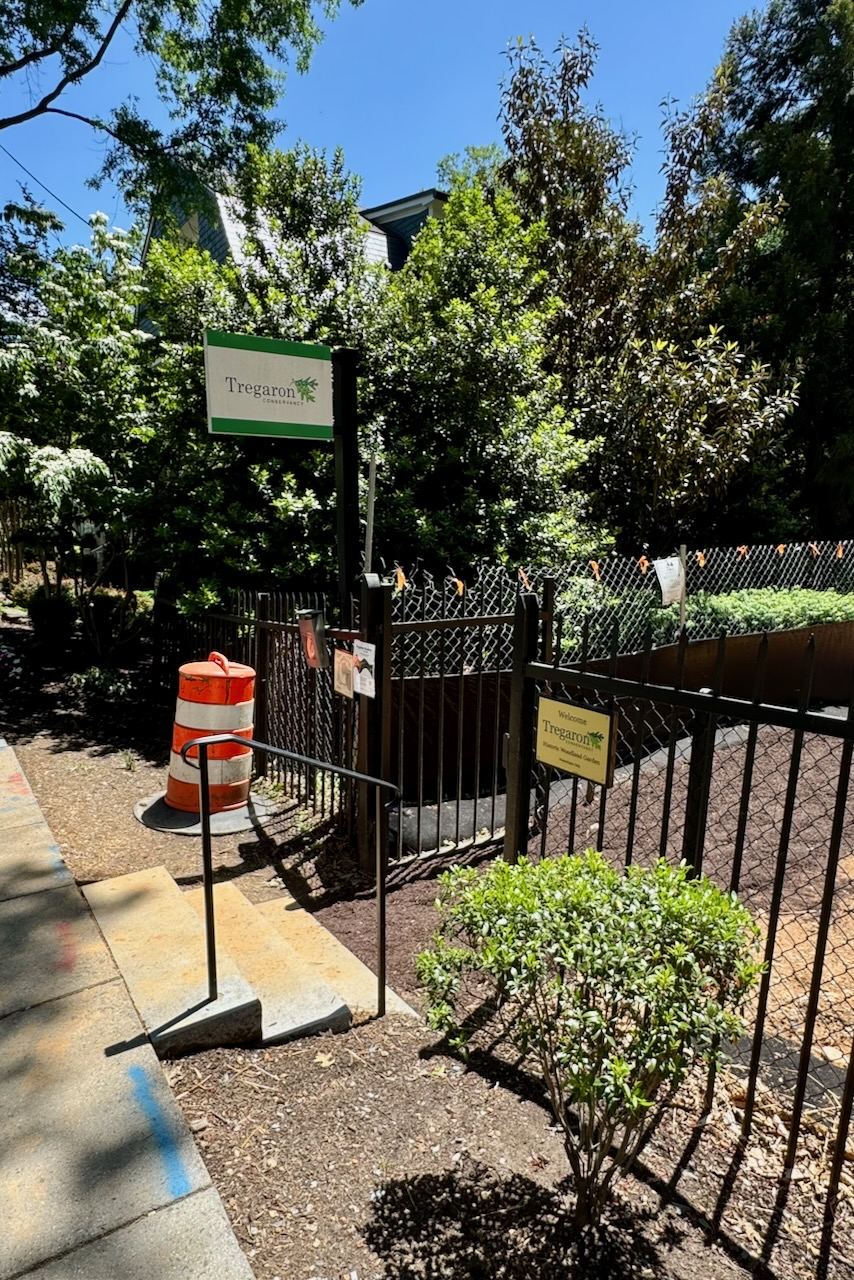
Macomb entrance

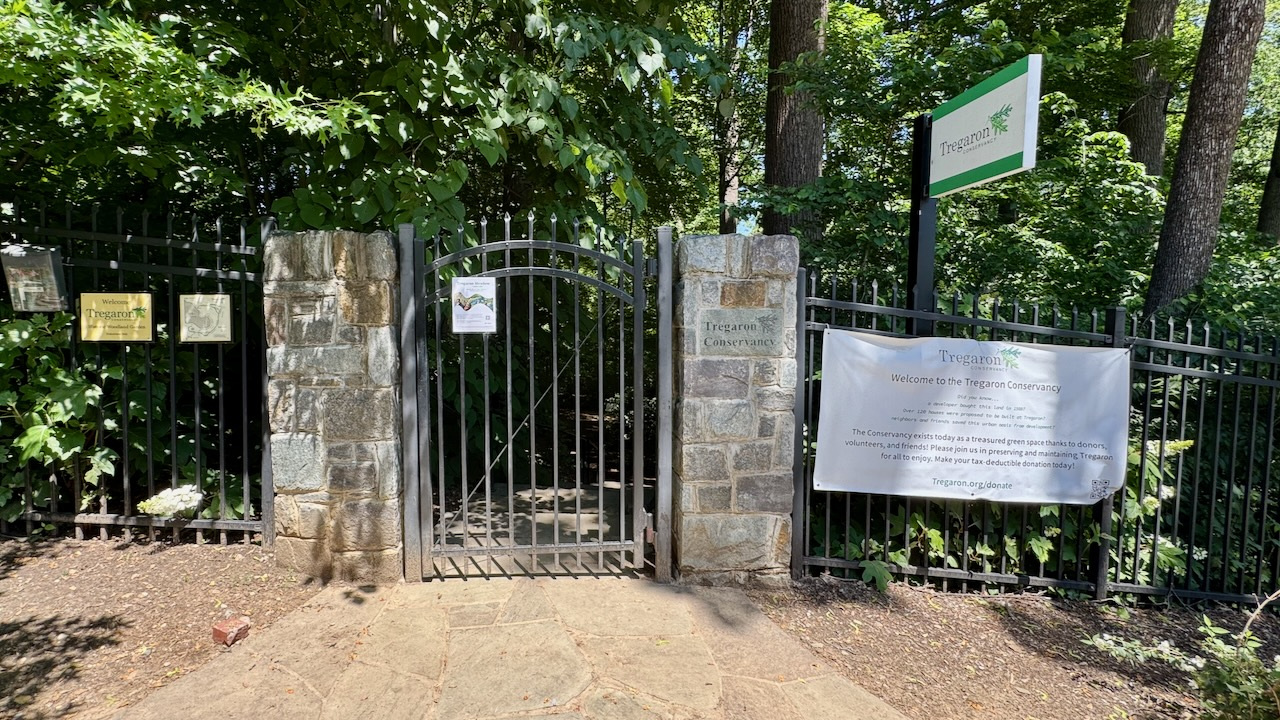
Klingle entrance

Tregaron was added to the National Register of Historic Places in 1990. In March 2006, the Washington D.C. Historic Preservation Office issued a decision and order finally resolving the dispute. The order noted Tregaron's "extraordinarily rare and important architectural and landscape resource" which it described as of an "exceptional level of significance." The preservation board believed "further subdivision of Tregaron is inherently inconsistent with the original unified character of the property," but lamented the degraded grounds, noting that "if nothing is done at Tregaron, the landscape will continue to deteriorate, erode and eventually be lost." Accordingly, the board approved an agreement reached in January 2006 between the developers, Washington International School, Friends of Tregaron agreed to allow development of a few residences and a soccer field in exchange for transfer of land and money to the conservancy for preservation of the property. The developers ceded 10 acres to the conservancy in exchange for limited development on the perimeter, the conservancy permitted limited expansion at the school reserved three board seats for representatives from the school, which would make contributions to the conservancy through 2017 and cede three acres to the conservancy. A significant part of the resolution concerns implementation of a cultural landscape report to guide rehabilitation, stewardship, and interpretation of the property. Where the original proposal envisioned as many as 200 units across the property, the eventual settlement would allow just eight units on one acre.

From 2006 to 2009, the conservancy was closed to the public to restore trails and clear overgrown vegetation. Over the decades of "profound neglect" the woodland had overgrown, invasive plants took root, the footpaths eroded and were blocked by fallen trees, and the lily pond had filled with mud. Using the Cultural Landscape Report as a guide, the conservancy has been removing invasive species, clearing fallen trees, planting new trees according to the original Shipman landscaping plan, rehabilitation of the lily pond, restoring meadows, rebuilding and repairing "stone walls, bridges, footpaths, and stairways throughout the property," as well as adding signage and maps to the entrances. In 2008, the conservancy was granted exemption from District of Columbia real estate taxes. In fall 2009, the conservancy opened to the public.

In 2012, the U.S. District Court dismissed a lawsuit attempting to prevent the permanent conversion of Klingle Valley Road into a bicycle and pedestrian trail, and in late 2014, final planning was completed. Klingle Road would have provided the only vehicular access to the remaining acre owned by the developers, and converting it to a trail effectively foreclosing development of the land. Through 2011, 2014, and 2015, transfers of parcels from Tregaron Limited Partnership to the conservancy were exempted from taxes. In March 2015, the final one acre parcel owned by the developers was transferred to the conservancy, and a plaque dedicated to "S. N. Eisenberg" in honor of his donation. Construction on the Klingle Valley Trail began in 2015, and it was opened for use in 2017, adding two new entrances to the conservancy's trail system.

=== School expansion controversy ===
In 2015, the relationship between the Conservancy and the Washington International School was tested when the school proposed building a science and parking facilities just as the school's financial support of the conservancy under the agreement was ending. In 2017, the school submitted a new revised proposal which the conservancy supported as part of an agreement that increased the conservancy board with proportional seats for representatives of the school, additional landscaping concessions, a ten-year moratorium on further construction, and $50,000 per year in funding through 2027. A group of citizens not satisfied with the compromise plan formed to object to the project. Critics decried the incompatibility of the plan with the character of the property, a conclusion the District of Columbia Historic Planning Office and Historic Preservation Review Board agreed with, denying the plan three times. In 2021, the school received historic preservation and zonging approval for a revised proposal which addressed critics' concerns and includes restoration of the original four-square garden.

As of 2025, the Washington International School is constructing a major renovation of its campus, but Tregaron's historic woodland gardens remain undeveloped and actively rehabilitated in the vision of Shipman.
