= Dorothy Goodman =

American educator (1926–2023)

Dorothy Goodman (née Bruchholz; January 15, 1926 – July 23, 2023) was an American educator closely associated with the charter school movement. She founded and served as Director of the Washington International School; launching the school with three 4-year-olds in the basement of her home in 1966 and served as headmistress until 1985, when the school enrolled 530 students, ranging in age from 3 to 18, representing 80 nations.

Dorothy Bruchholz was born in Minneapolis on January 15, 1926. She was educated at Bryn Mawr College and received her Ph.D. from the University of London.

Goodman was a founder of the International Baccalaureate: North America, and has been credited with the success of that program. She has served as Chairwoman of Friends of International Education (FIE) and president of Committee for Public Autonomous Schools (COMPASS), an organization that supports the founding of public charter schools. She advocated the teaching of Chinese and Russian to American students, saying she was inspired in this by Lee Kuan Yew, long-time prime minister of Singapore. She has also been a trustee of the UWC-USA, and a visible and vocal spokesperson for educational causes globally.

Dorothy Goodman died of congestive heart failure at her home in Washington, D.C., on July 23, 2023, at the age of 97.
