= Pittsburgh Parks Conservancy =

US non-profit organization

- Founded: 1996; 30 years ago
- Founder: Meg Cheever
- Location(s): 317 East Carson Street, West Tower; Pittsburgh, Pennsylvania
- Origins: Schenley Park Conservancy
- Volunteers: 1,570
- Website: pittsburghparks.org

Pittsburgh Parks Conservancy was founded in December 1996 by a group of citizens concerned with the deteriorating conditions of Pittsburgh’s historic city parks. A non-profit organization, the Parks Conservancy works closely with the City of Pittsburgh under an official public-private partnership agreement to restore and improve the city’s park system to its full potential. To date, the Parks Conservancy has raised more than $130 million and completed 22 major park improvement projects. A team of 40 dedicated Parks Conservancy employees work with thousands of volunteers, host hundreds of events, and provide programming for more than 7,500 children annually.

== History ==
The Pittsburgh Parks Conservancy was founded in 1996 by Meg Cheever, former publisher of Pittsburgh Magazine, who modeled it on other private/public partnerships in Louisville, Kentucky, New York City, and Buffalo, New York. To date, the Parks Conservancy has raised more than $130 million to restore Pittsburgh’s park system to excellence and completed 22 major improvement projects.

Currently active in 22 of the city's 165 park sites, the Parks Conservancy has expanded into community and neighborhood parks throughout Pittsburgh. The Conservancy is committed to improving the quality of life for the people of Pittsburgh by restoring the park system to excellence in partnership with government and the community. Projects and programs are conducted with respect for the environment, historic design, and the needs of our diverse region.

== Projects ==
In addition to youth and adult programming, maintenance, fundraising, and a host of other activities on behalf of the parks, the Pittsburgh Parks Conservancy works in close partnership with the City of Pittsburgh, other government entities, local foundations, and the community on major park improvement projects. To date, the Parks Conservancy has completed the following capital projects:

- The Reynolds Street gatehouse entrance to Frick Park
- The restoration of the Schenley Park Visitor Center
- The creation of a babbling brook to dechlorinate wastewater from Highland Park's water filtration plant
- The ecological restoration of the Phipps Run natural area in Schenley Park
- The restoration of the Highland Park Entry Garden
- The conversion of Schenley Plaza from a parking lot into the grand entrance to Schenley Park
- The creation of a seasonal pools and wetland habitat along Highland Park's Washington Boulevard
- The ecological restoration of the Panther Hollow Watershed in Schenley Park
- The restoration of the Riverview Park Chapel Shelter and its surrounding landscape
- The restoration of the Mary E. Schenley Memorial Fountain in Schenley Plaza
- The restoration of the Mellon Park Walled Garden and installation of public art piece
- Completion of a federally funded trail and signage project
- The revitalization of the entrance of McKinley Park in Beltzhoover
- The restoration of downtown Pittsburgh’s Mellon Square
- The renovation of August Wilson Park, formerly known as Cliffside Park
- The rebuilding of the Frick Environmental Center
- The rehabilitation of the Westinghouse Memorial and Pond
- The restoration of the Schenley Park Café and Visitor Center
- The restoration of the Northeast Fountain in Allegheny Commons Park
- The rehabilitation of the first phase of the Allegheny Commons Park North Promenade project

== Park programs ==
The Pittsburgh Parks Conservancy works with thousands of volunteers, hosts hundreds of events, and provides programming for more than 7,500 children annually. Offerings include free events for families to a robust catalogue of summer camps for young learners to fitness classes in the parks.

== Creating a More Equitable Parks System ==
The Pittsburgh Parks Conservancy created the Restoring Pittsburgh Parks: The Parks Plan, in partnership with the City of Pittsburgh and community members, to establish a more equitable parks system for all Pittsburghers, while also addressing a $400 million shortfall of deferred capital repairs and an annual $13 million maintenance shortfall. The Plan calls for enough annual resources to prevent future backlogs, such as the one Pittsburgh’s park system currently faces.

A new ballot initiative was proposed to raise enough annual funds to address the ongoing need. The ballot initiative aimed to establish a dedicated Parks Trust Fund to invest in high-quality parks for every citizen of Pittsburgh. This initiative was driven by the community, for the community. Neighbors, park users, and enthusiasts were critically involved in building the Restoring Pittsburgh Parks: The Parks Plan through Parks Conservancy community outreach, meetings, and surveys. This community outreach supported a data-driven foundation built to ensure equity across the City of Pittsburgh.

The ballot question was approved by the citizens of Pittsburgh on November 5, 2019, who voted ‘yes’ to increased funding for Pittsburgh’s park system. This initiative will guarantee an additional $10 million per year to Pittsburgh’s parks, in perpetuity, funded by a 0.5 mill property tax levy ($50 for every $100,000 of assessed real estate value). This was the first referendum to pass in the City of Pittsburgh in nearly 10 years. Beyond The Parks Plan, the Conservancy supports many initiatives that place equity at the forefront, including the Black Lives Matter movement, the creation of an internal Diversity, Equity, and Inclusion plan, and providing free programs in traditionally underserved communities.

== Gallery ==
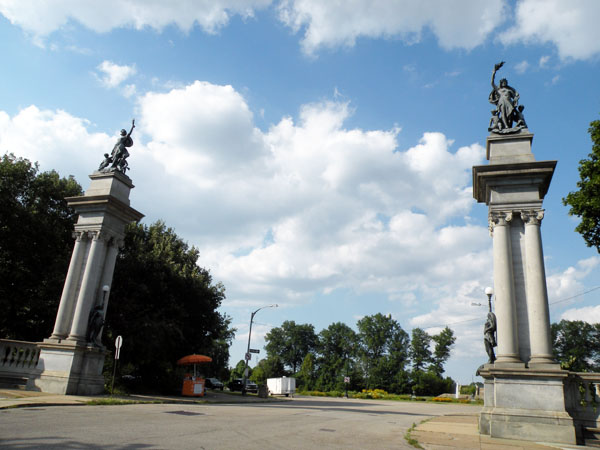

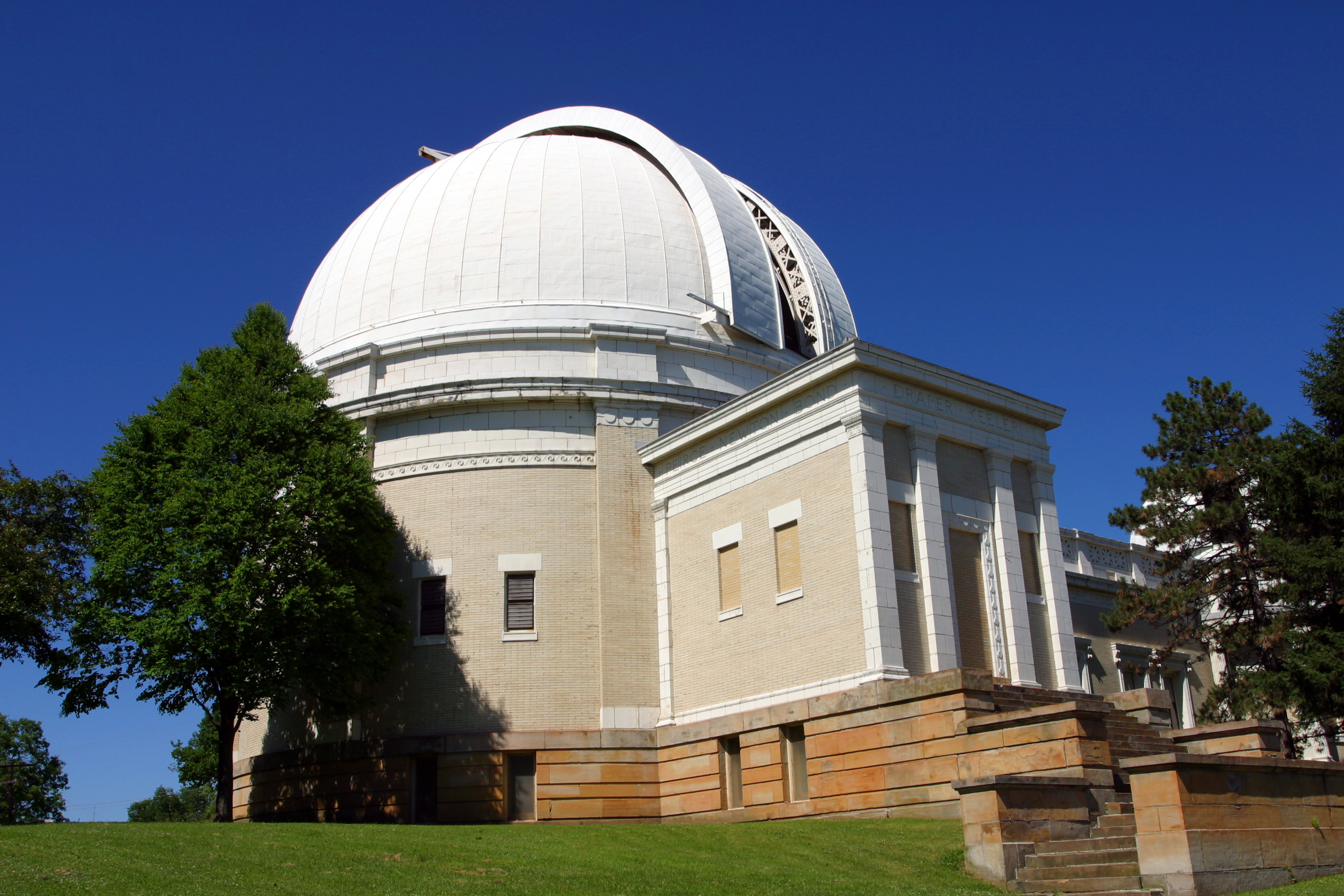

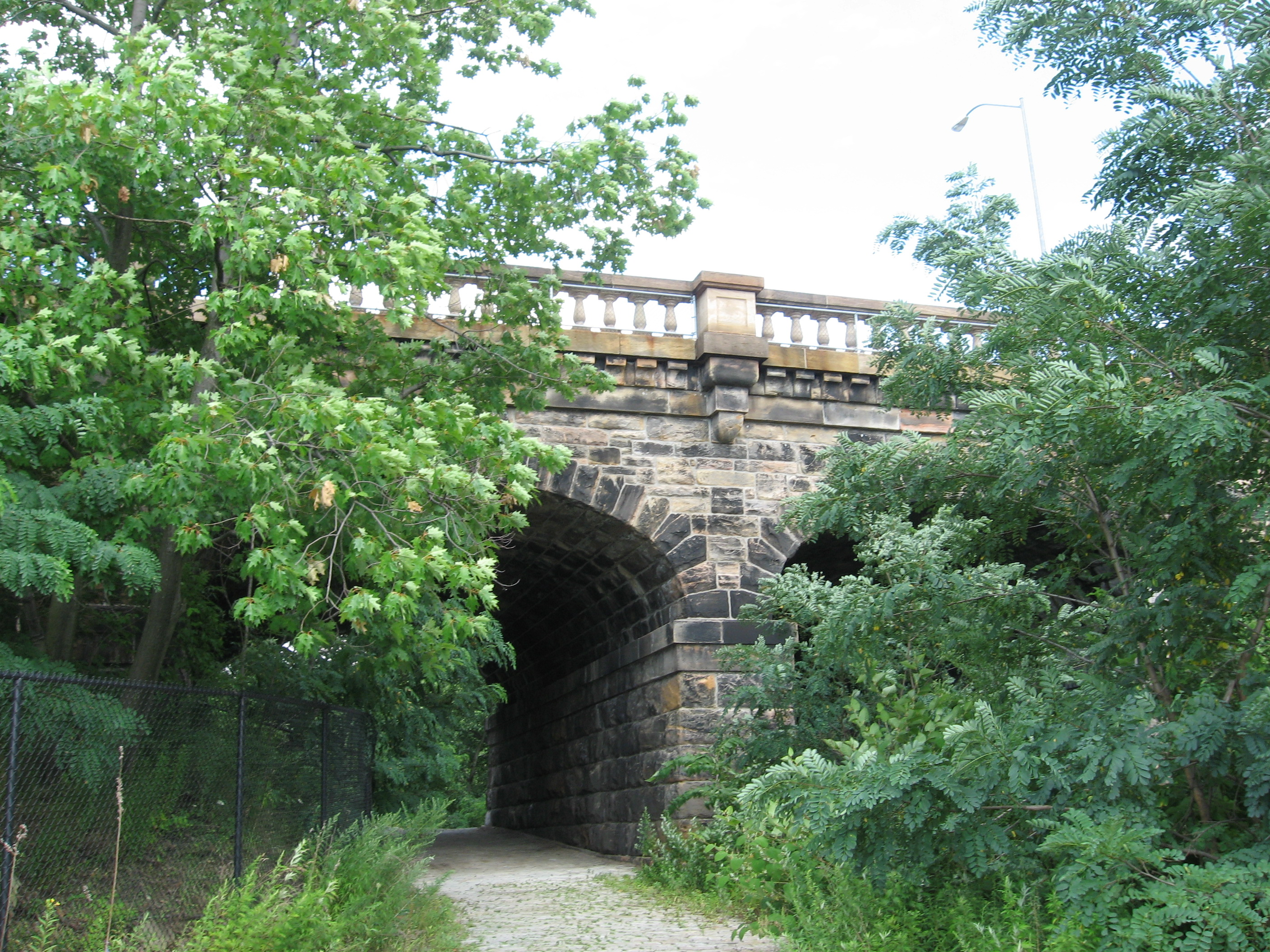

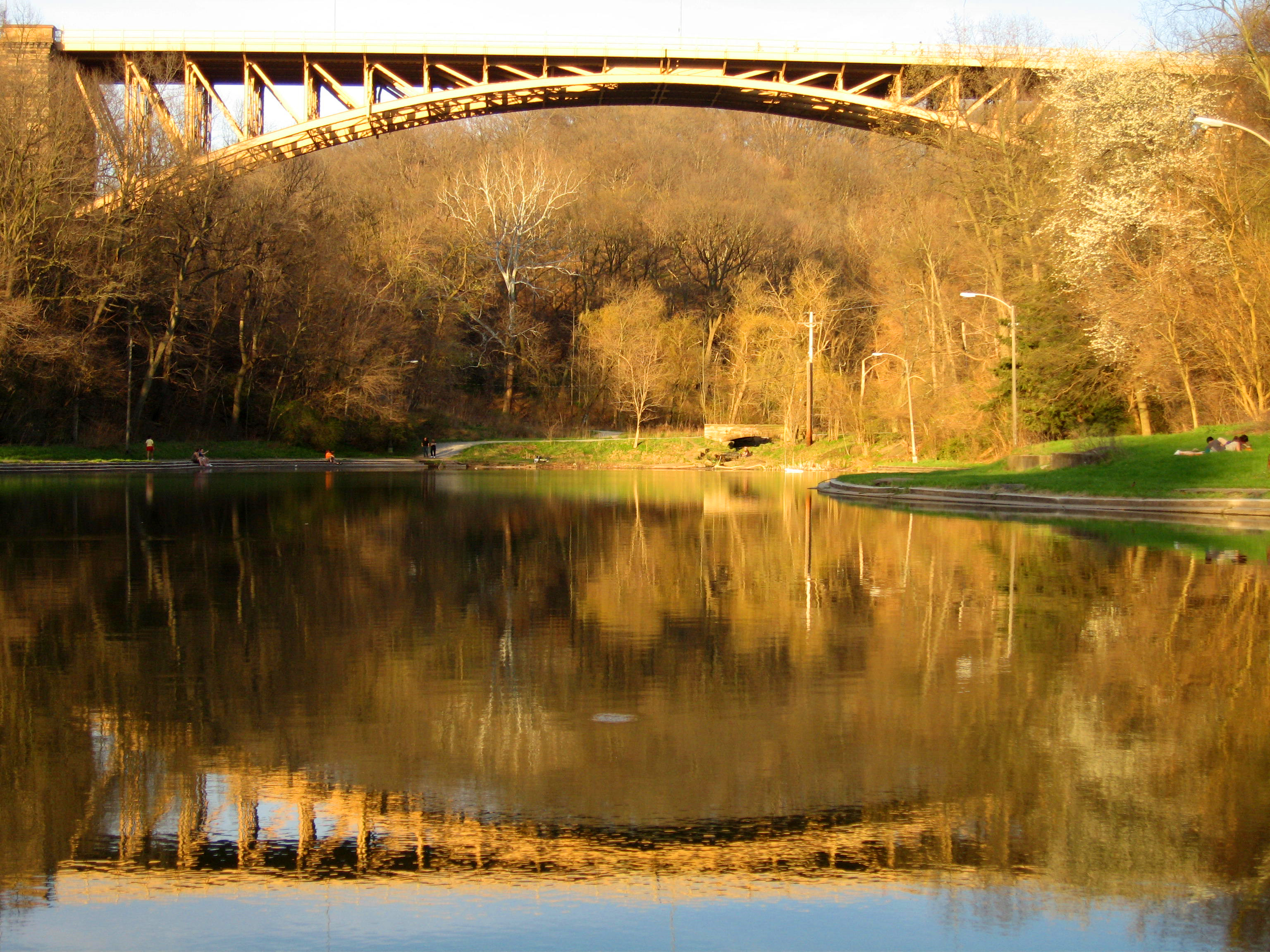

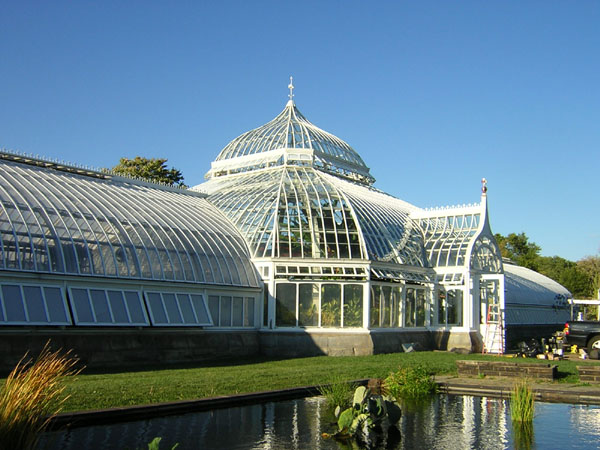

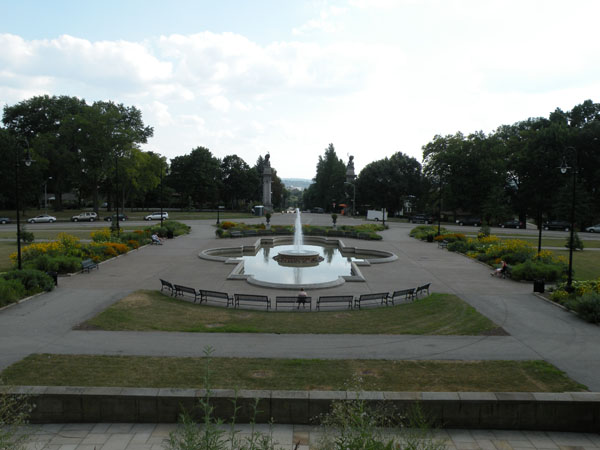

== See also ==
- 10-Minute Walk
- Park conservancy
