= Park conservancy =

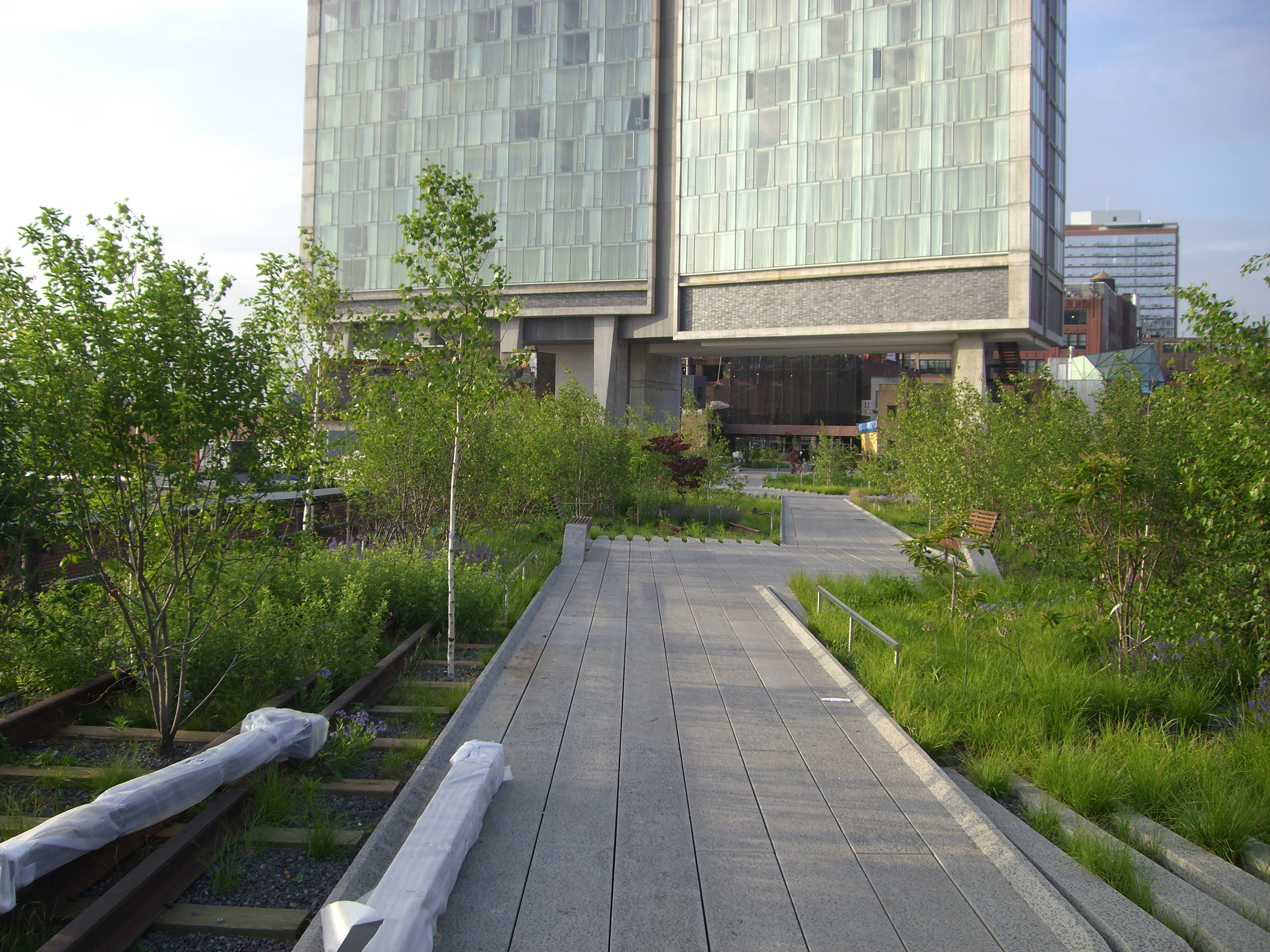
The High Line, an example of a park managed by a conservancy.

A park conservancy is a type of private, non-profit organization in the United States, that can support the maintenance, capital development, and advocacy for parks or park systems. These organizations raise money through a variety of means to care for urban parks, and while there is not a single model for how a park conservancy can or should be developed, they are created to meet the needs of local communities based on their resources and political situations.

== Park conservancy development ==
Park conservancies developed in relation to what some call a fifth model for parks, namely those that are sustainable in plantings, usage, and funding. This arose in part due to a lack of public funding allocation for parks, along with a structure that allowed the members of the community to directly support their own parks. The number of parks conservancies has grown in the past decades as city funding for parks has in many cases declined, playing an increasingly prominent role in urban parks. One particular aspect of them involves their management, which is independent of local municipal elections. They generally take a long-term perspective on parks, and as a result are financially focused on long-term sustainability to meet their management needs. While the Central Park Conservancy is often considered the first of its kind, they remain different than Friends of the Park groups, Business Improvement Districts (BIDs), and most conservancies in California (where conservancies are often names after state agencies).

== Controversies ==
While park conservancies are increasingly relied upon to manage, fund, and care for urban parks, they are not without controversy. Some claim that their popularity encourages government to step back from their responsibilities to fund public spaces, and the more they give away their authority the less public oversight exists. Along these lines, funding decisions increasingly depend upon fund-raising, leading to potential conflicts with wealthy donors influencing decisions that affect the rights of those who are often poorest and in most need of the parks themselves.

== Prominent park conservancies ==
While New York City has the most conservancies of any American city, conservancy management and care of large and small urban parks can be found across the country. One size or approach to developing or using park conservancies will not be the same everywhere based on size or funding, Some of these include:

- Abingdon Square Park, New York, NY
- Balboa Park, San Francisco, CA
- Brooklyn Bridge Park, Brooklyn, NY
- Central Park Conservancy, New York, NY
- Forest Park, St. Louis, MO
- Golden Gate National Parks (GGNRA), San Francisco Bay Area, CA
- The High Line, New York, NY
- Memphis River Parks Partnership, Memphis, TN
- Millennium Park, Chicago, IL
- Overton Park Conservancy Memphis, TN
- Piedmont Park, Atlanta, GA
- Pittsburgh Parks Conservancy, Pittsburgh, PA
- Shelby Farms Park Conservancy, Memphis, TN
- Tregaron Conservancy, Washington, D.C.
