= Klingle Valley Trail =

Trail in Washington, D.C.

Coordinates: 38°55′48.7″N 77°3′40.6″W

The Klingle Valley Trail is a trail in the northwest quadrant of Washington, D.C.

In 1990, erosion led to the closure of a 0.75-mile section of the road between Cortland Place and Porter Street. This touched off a decades-long dispute between people who wanted the road repaired and those who wanted to keep the portion in Rock Creek Park free of automobile traffic. In 2017, that portion of Klingle Road became Klingle Valley Trail, reserved for hikers and bicyclists.

== Location ==
The valley forms the boundary between the Woodley Park neighborhood to the south and the Cleveland Park neighborhood to the north. The Tregaron Conservancy can be accessed from two locations on the trail. A small stream, usually called Klingle Creek (but sometimes the Klingle Tributary), flows through it, and empties into Rock Creek. Much of the valley is administered by the National Park Service as a part of Rock Creek Park. The mouth of the valley joins the mouth of another narrow valley occupied by Porter Street.

== History ==
Formerly Klingle Ford Road, Klingle Road became a public roadway in 1839, but only later was named Klingle. The road is named for Joshua Pierce Klingle, the nephew of Pierce Mill owner Joshua Pierce and was originally known as Klingle's Road. Klingle, who was adopted by Pierce when his parents died, inherited Pierce's land upon his death and in 1891 sold a large portion of it to the federal government for the creation of Rock Creek Park.

In 1885, the Klingle Road right-of-way was deeded to the city for use as a public highway. Five years later, when Congress authorized the creation of Rock Creek Park, Klingle formed the rough southern border of the new park. Along with Peirce Mill and Military Roads, it was the only roads that spanned the park north of the National Zoological Park.

In 1913, the city generated a plan to straighten and widen the street as Klingle Parkway, connecting Beach Drive and Reno Road. Before World War I, the road was used by farmers to bring grain to Peirce Mill.

Klingle Road remains listed as an arterial roadway for vehicular traffic on the District of Columbia's Functional Classification Map and is a part of DC's permanent system of highways. Klingle Road remains a right-of-way on the federal-aid system and has not been officially or administratively closed.

== Closure and ensuing dispute ==
A section of the roadway was barricaded in 1990 after erosion severely damaged a 0.75 miles (1.21 km) section. Because the road had been used by up to 3,200 cars a day, a campaign was launched to repair and reopen the road. But a competing campaign, led by the Sierra Club of DC, advocated for replacing the road with a bicycle, hiking, or bridle path.

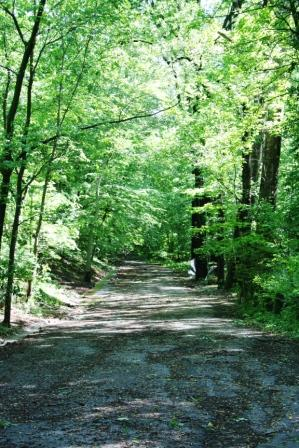
View of the closed road, through the heavily forested parkland.

The repair-and-rebuild faction persuaded the D.C. government to commission a feasibility study by the Berger Group, an engineering consultancy. Published in August 1999, the study ruled out no options, and so did not end the dispute.

In 2003, Mayor Anthony Williams expressed opposition to the demands that the road be rebuilt, but was overruled by the Council of the District, which in 2003 passed a line item in the District budget bill requiring that Klingle Road "be re-opened to the public for motor vehicle traffic" in 2007.

An environmental impact study was performed in order to apply for federal funding for the construction. Repeated efforts to properly complete this environmental impact study were returned by the federal government to the District for rewriting and changes. In 2008, District Mayor Adrian Fenty attempted to bypass the environmental impact statement by providing full local funding of the automobile road. But Ward 3 Councilmember Mary Cheh succeeded in replacing this appropriation with a provision calling for the road to "remain closed to motorized vehicular traffic" and the right-of-way employed instead for a non-motorized-use trail. Ward 1 Councilmember Jim Graham attempted to restore funding for the automobile road, but his amendment was rejected by the District Council by a 10–3 vote.

=== Outcome ===
After two decades of dispute, the road was replaced with a trail for hikers and bicyclists.

A 2011 Environmental Assessment resulted in a finding of "No Significant Impact". This assessment said the "preferred option" was a 10-foot-wide permeable-surface multi-use trail, full-stream channel and bank stabilization for Klingle Creek, a multi-use trail connecting this trail to the existing Rock Creek trail, and pole or bollard lighting of the trail to facilitate nighttime use. On February 28, 2011, the Federal Highway Administration accepted this finding. But the assessment was challenged in federal court with a November 1, 2011, lawsuit demanding that the District and federal governments "refrain from any further planning, acquisition of right-of-way, financing, contracting, or construction of the Klingle Trail Project". On February 1, 2012, the defendants submitted a motion to have the court dismiss this suit. On August 9, 2012, the U.S. District Court did indeed dismiss the suit "for lack of subject-matter jurisdiction".

A permit to begin restoration of the creek bed, retaining walls, and water-permeable trail was granted in October 2014. Preliminary work on the Trail began in July 2015.

On June 24, 2017, the Klingle Valley Trail was opened to the public.

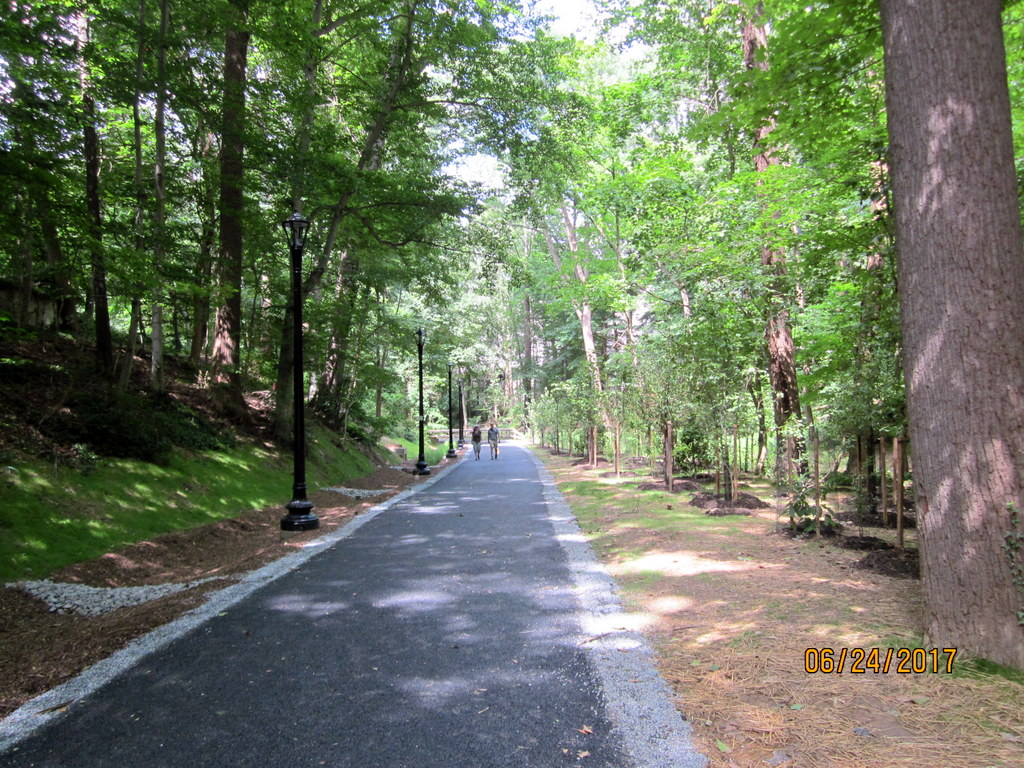
A view of the trail through the Klingle Valley on June 24, 2017, the day it opened to the public.
