= Washington International School =

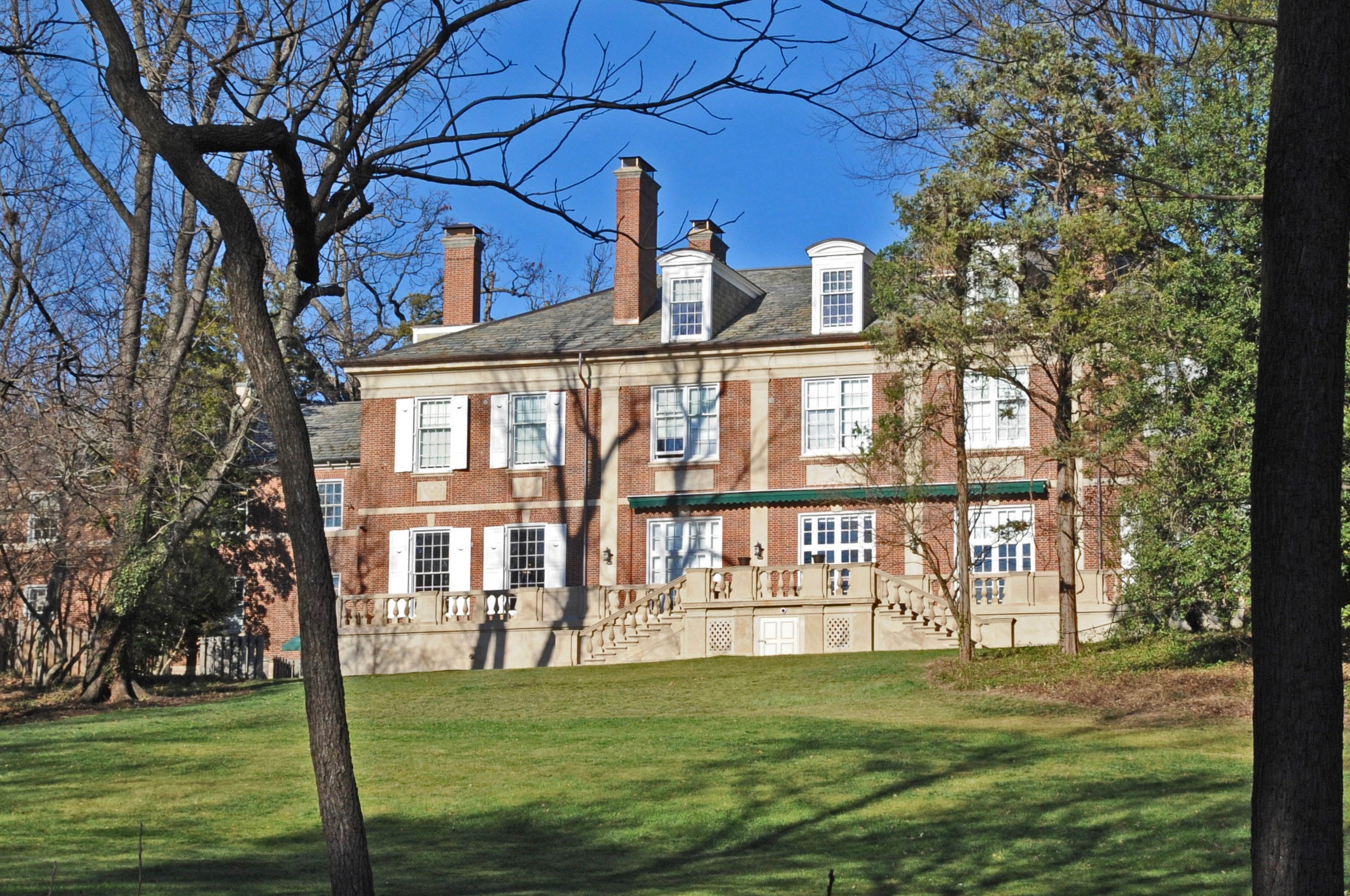
- Tregaron Campus in 2016

Location
- 1690 36th Street NW; Washington, D.C. 20007; United States; 38°56′02″N 77°03′42″W

Information
- Type: Independent
- Established: 1966 (60 years ago)
- CEEB code: 090226
- Head of school: Suzanna Jemsby
- Faculty: 90 full-time, 14 part-time
- Enrollment: 905 day
- Student to teacher ratio: 8.2:1
- Mascot: Red Devils
- Newspaper: The International Dateline
- Website: www.wis.edu

The Washington International School (abbreviated as WIS; Spanish: Colegio Internacional de Washington; French: École Internationale de Washington) is a private international school in Washington, DC.

Established in 1966, WIS was the first school in the Washington area to offer the International Baccalaureate (IB) program.

The school has two campuses: the primary school (grades PK–5) in Georgetown, and the middle and upper school (grades 6–12) in Cleveland Park. The middle and upper school campus is located on the grounds of Marjorie Merriweather Post's Tregaron Estate.

The Washington International School's upper school was ranked as the 73rd most challenging high school in the country and the most challenging high school in the Washington, D.C., area by the Washington Post's "Ranking America's most challenging high schools" article in 2016. Popular school ranking website Niche listed it as the eighth best private high school in the D.C. area.

== History ==
Washington International School (WIS) was founded in 1966 to serve the international community in the D.C. area. During the post-World War II era, many international schools were founded by a particular community or nationality and were "international" in the sense that students from other nationalities were accepted. From the very beginning, founder Dorothy Goodman envisioned that the school would educate children to become global citizens and the early curriculum reflected her vision. Children were taught several different languages and about world cultures, literature and history. In 1969, with assistance from the Ford Foundation, WIS expanded its campus with the purchase of the former Wendell Phillips School, which had closed a number of years before. In 1980 the Tregaron country house and estate was purchased and has been the site of the Middle (grades 6–8) and Upper Schools (9–12) ever since. The Elementary School moved out of the former Wendell Phillips School building in 1998 and the property was sold and developed into private housing. In the early 2000s, WIS constructed an “arts, academics, and athletics building” (AAA) containing a gymnasium, choral and band practice rooms, and classrooms. In 2021, the School launched a campaign to raise $30 million with the primary goal of constructing a new science centric facility on campus. It is scheduled to be completed in spring 2025.

Campuses in Washington, DC

== Athletics ==
In 2010, WIS won finals of the soccer PVAC tournament in a 2–0 win. WIS has done relatively well in the PVAC league and has achieved state wide success in soccer, winning the DCSAA tournament in 2016 after reaching the final for the first time in 2015. In 2022, the soccer team once again reached the final of the DCSAA tournament, falling to Gonzaga College High School. Later, in 2025, the Red Devils would reclaim their title, beating the St. John's Cadets in the final on penalties after a tense 0-0 draw at Carlini Field.

== Affiliation ==
Washington International School is affiliated with the National Association of Independent Schools, the Council of International Schools, the Middle States Association of Colleges and Schools, and the European Council of International Schools.

== Notable alumni ==
- Sarah "Sally" Otto '85: Evolutionary Biologist, 2011 MacArthur Fellow, Member of the US National Academy of Sciences
- Molly Neuman '89: Musician
- Julia Vogl '03: Artist

== Filming at WIS ==
- The mental hospital scene in The Pelican Brief was filmed in the mansion of the Tregaron Campus.
- The humor coach scene in Borat: Cultural Learnings of America for Make Benefit Glorious Nation of Kazakhstan was filmed in the Mansion (Room 205) of the Tregaron Campus.
- Several scenes in Advise and Consent were also filmed in the mansion of the Tregaron Campus.
