= Equestrian statue of George Washington (Washington Circle) =

Statue by Clark Mills in Washington, D.C.

- Lieutenant General George Washington
- U.S. Historic district – Contributing property
- D.C. Inventory of Historic Sites
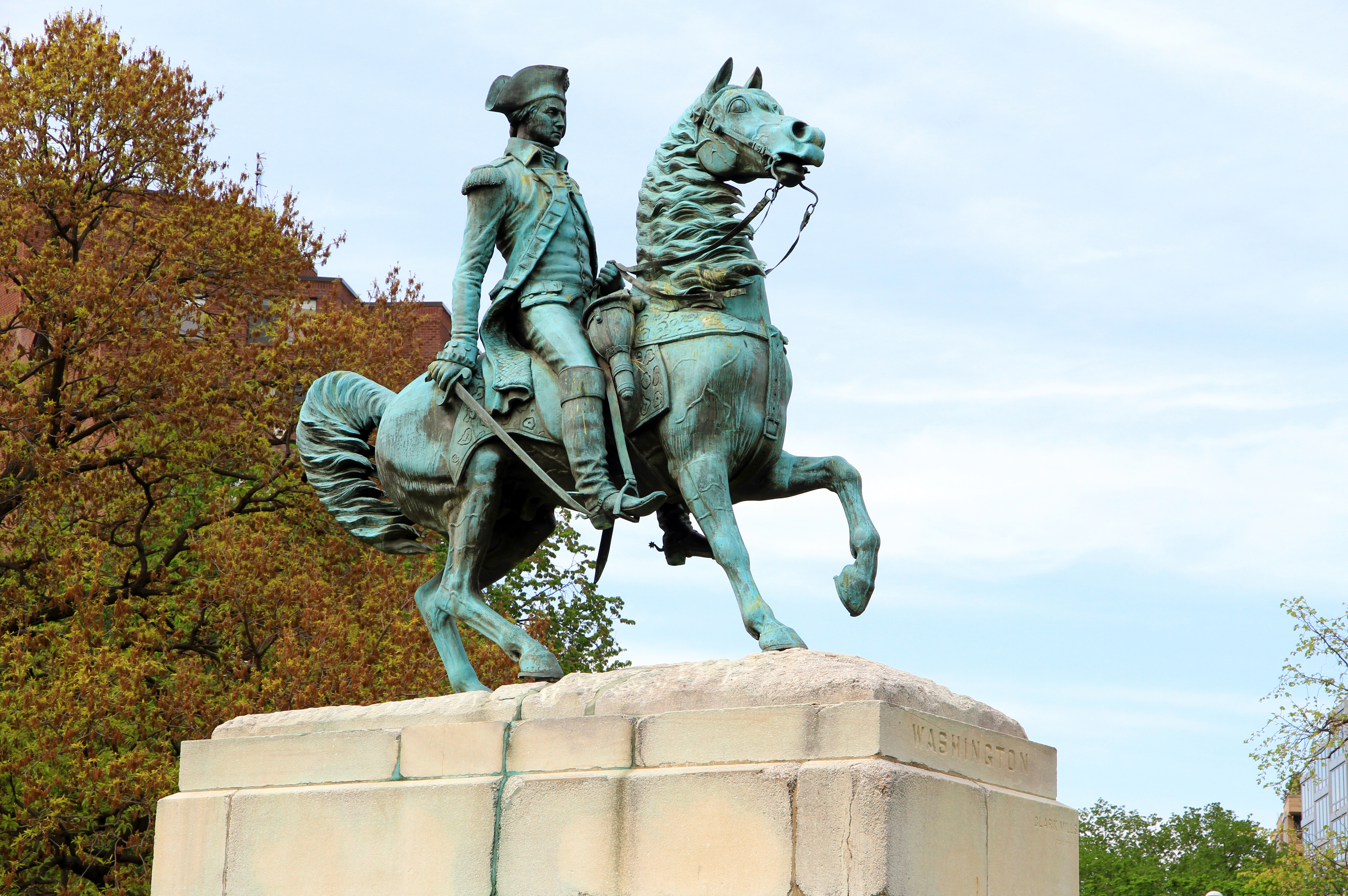
- Statue of George Washington in 2013
- Location: Washington Circle, Washington, D.C.
- Coordinates: 38°54′8.45″N 77°3′1.08″W
- Built: 1860
- Architect: Clark Mills
- NRHP reference No.: American Revolution Statuary (78000256); L'Enfant Plan (97000332)

Significant dates
- Designated CP: July 14, 1978 (American Revolution Statuary); April 24, 1997 (L'Enfant Plan)
- Designated DCIHS: March 3, 1979 (American Revolution Statuary); April 24, 1997 (L'Enfant Plan)

Lieutenant General George Washington is an 1860 equestrian statue of George Washington, at Washington Circle, at the edge of the George Washington University's campus, in Washington, D.C. The statue was sculpted by Clark Mills, who also created the equestrian statue of Andrew Jackson in front of the White House. The traffic circle where the statue is located was one of the original city designs by Pierre Charles L'Enfant. The statue and surrounding park are in the Foggy Bottom neighborhood at the intersection of 23rd Street, New Hampshire Avenue, and Pennsylvania Avenue NW. The K Street NW underpass runs beneath the circle.

The idea of honoring George Washington, one of the Founding Fathers, the military leader of the American Revolutionary War, and the first U.S. president, was first authorized by the Congress of the Confederation in 1783. Despite periodic calls for the erection of a statue honoring Washington, nothing happened until future President James Buchanan made inquiries into why the statue was never installed. Congress authorized the statue and its installation in 1853 at a cost of $50,000, which was later increased to $60,000. Mills' original design included a three-tier pedestal with intricate designs. Due to a lack of funding, that was never built. The final product was a marble pedestal that is somewhat simple. The horse's design was praised, but Washington's portrayal was frowned upon by critics.

The unveiling and dedication ceremony occurred in February 1860, not long before the American Civil War began. The keynote speaker at the ceremony, U.S. Representative Thomas S. Bocock, would become Speaker of the Confederate States Congress within a year. Amongst the notable attendees at the event included the president, the vice president, members of the Supreme Court, and members of the Senate. The event was delayed due to weather, but a half-mile long (0.8 km) procession marched from the District of Columbia City Hall to the statue. Many of those who marched were active members of the military and veterans.

The statue was almost moved twice to Lafayette Square to be replaced with the Mills' statue of Jackson. It was repaired in the 1920s and moved in the 1960s when the underpass beneath Washington Circle was built. The statue is one of 14 American Revolution Statuary that were collectively listed on the National Register of Historic Places (NRHP) and the District of Columbia Inventory of Historic Sites. The statue is also a contributing property to the L'Enfant Plan, listed on the NRHP in 1997.

== History ==
=== Biographies ===
==== George Washington ====
George Washington was born in Virginia on February 22, 1732, to a privileged family. Although he did not attend a well-known school or university, Washington received education at the Lower Church in Hartfield, Virginia. He was an avid writer and later surveyed what was then the frontier of the Thirteen Colonies. He later trained as a soldier and led the Virginia Regiment during the French and Indian War. Washington then served in the House of Burgesses before war broke out between the colonies and the Kingdom of Great Britain. He was appointed Commander-in-Chief of the Continental Army and played a major role in winning the American Revolutionary War. After resigning as commander-in-chief in 1783, he presided over the Constitutional Convention in 1787, helping draft the Constitution and becoming one of the Founding Fathers. He served two terms as President of the United States, setting precedents that were followed by future presidents. After his second term was over, Washington retired and spent his last two years at Mount Vernon.

==== Clark Mills ====
Clark Mills was born September 1, 1815, in New York. He received limited education and later worked a number of jobs, including as a lumberjack and carpenter. In 1837, Mills moved to Charleston, South Carolina, and became an ornamental plasterer, working at his studio. His techniques improved in the 1840s and he began making plaster life-masks. With these masks, he then began making busts. According to historian and educator E. Wayne Craven, "What [Mills] learned he acquired from the life-mask itself, and this established his style as one strongly dependent upon naturalism." His first notable client was former Vice President John C. Calhoun, of whom he made a bust in 1845. In addition to his studio in Charleston, Mills built a studio on The Ellipse nea the White House in 1849. It was at that studio Mills sculpted the equestrian statue of President Andrew Jackson and the George Washington equestrian statue. One of his most prominent death masks was that of President Abraham Lincoln in 1865. After his retirement, Mills continued living in Washington, D.C., and died in 1883.

=== Memorial plans ===
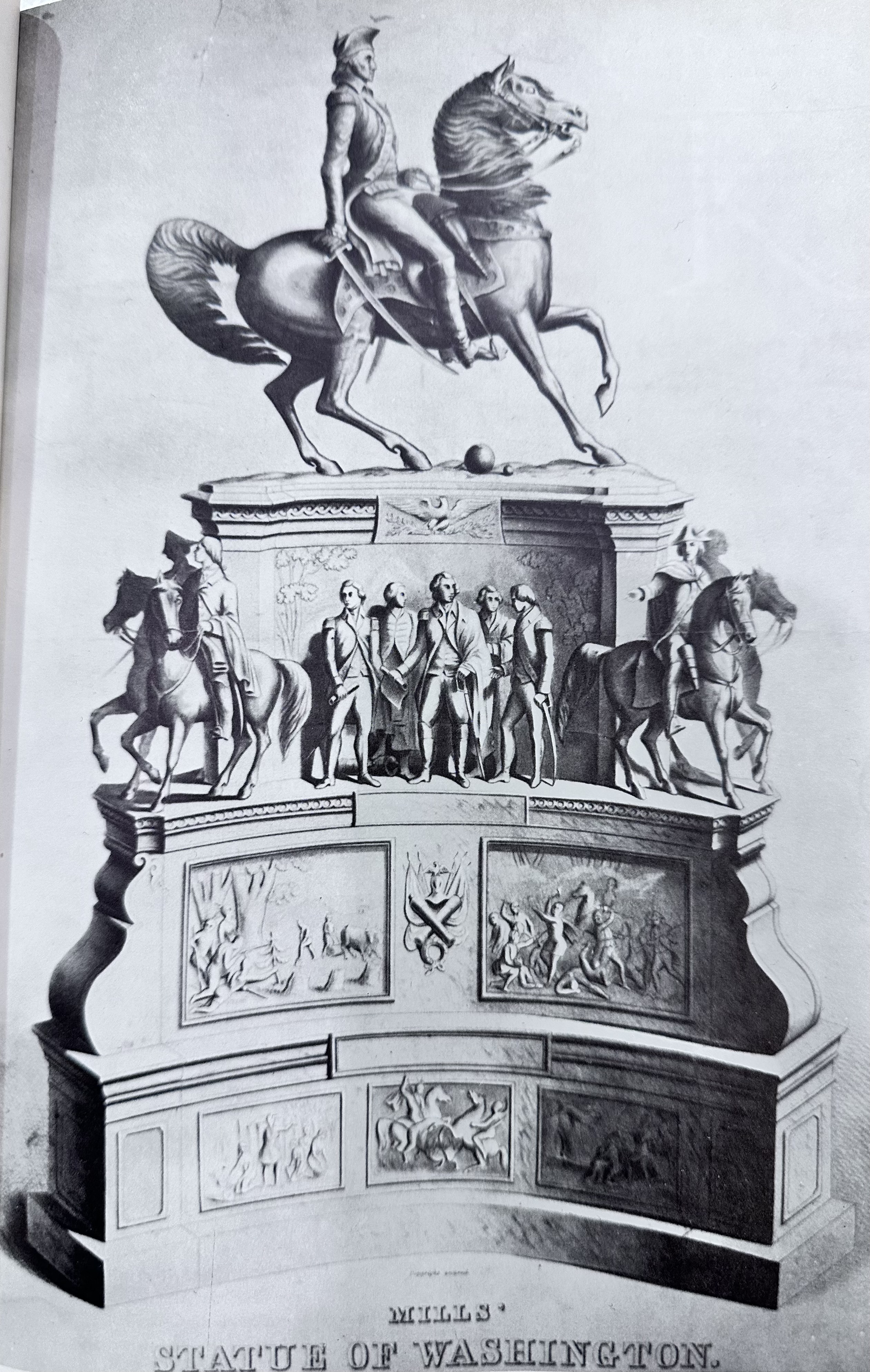
The original design by Clark Mills

On August 7, 1783, the Congress of the Confederation voted for a statue to be erected in honor of Washington. Nothing happened though, and despite officials calling for a statue during the next few decades, the plan never came into fruition. Future President James Buchanan led the cause for a statue to be erected, referencing the earlier resolution made by the House of Representatives in 1799. After Mills debuted his equestrian sculpture of Andrew Jackson, the U.S. Congress commissioned Mills to make another memorial, this time honoring Washington. The Act of Congress passed on January 25, 1853, for the Washington statue, and $50,000 was appropriated for the installation. It was expected to be just as good if not more grand than the Jackson statue. The first site chosen, beside the Washington Monument, was eliminated. It is unknown why the location of the statue was chosen, but the circle, nicknamed "Round Tops" at the time, was improved in 1855 by adding wooden fences. The following year, shrubs and trees were planted.

The pedestal for the statue was to be a large and elaborate work. Plans included a three-tiered base with bas-reliefs panels and small equestrian statues of Washington's generals from the war. The plan for that was cancelled due to a lack of funding. The result was a smaller pedestal with no elaborate details. On February 24, 1860, an additional $10,000 would be approved by Congress for the work, just a few days after it was unveiled. The statue and pedestal were finished by the end of 1859, and plans were made for the unveiling and dedication ceremony of the city's second outdoor monument at that time.

=== Dedication ===
The unveiling and dedication ceremony took place on Washington's birthday, February 22, in 1860. The Alexandria Gazette and Virginia Advertiser described the ceremony as "the event of the season." According to historian Constance McLaughlin Green, the ceremony was the "last great public nonpartisan demonstration in the ante-bellum capital" as the Civil War began the following year. Researcher Jason Bezis said "It came at a moment of great tension as John Brown's failed raid on Harper's Ferry occurred just a few months earlier."

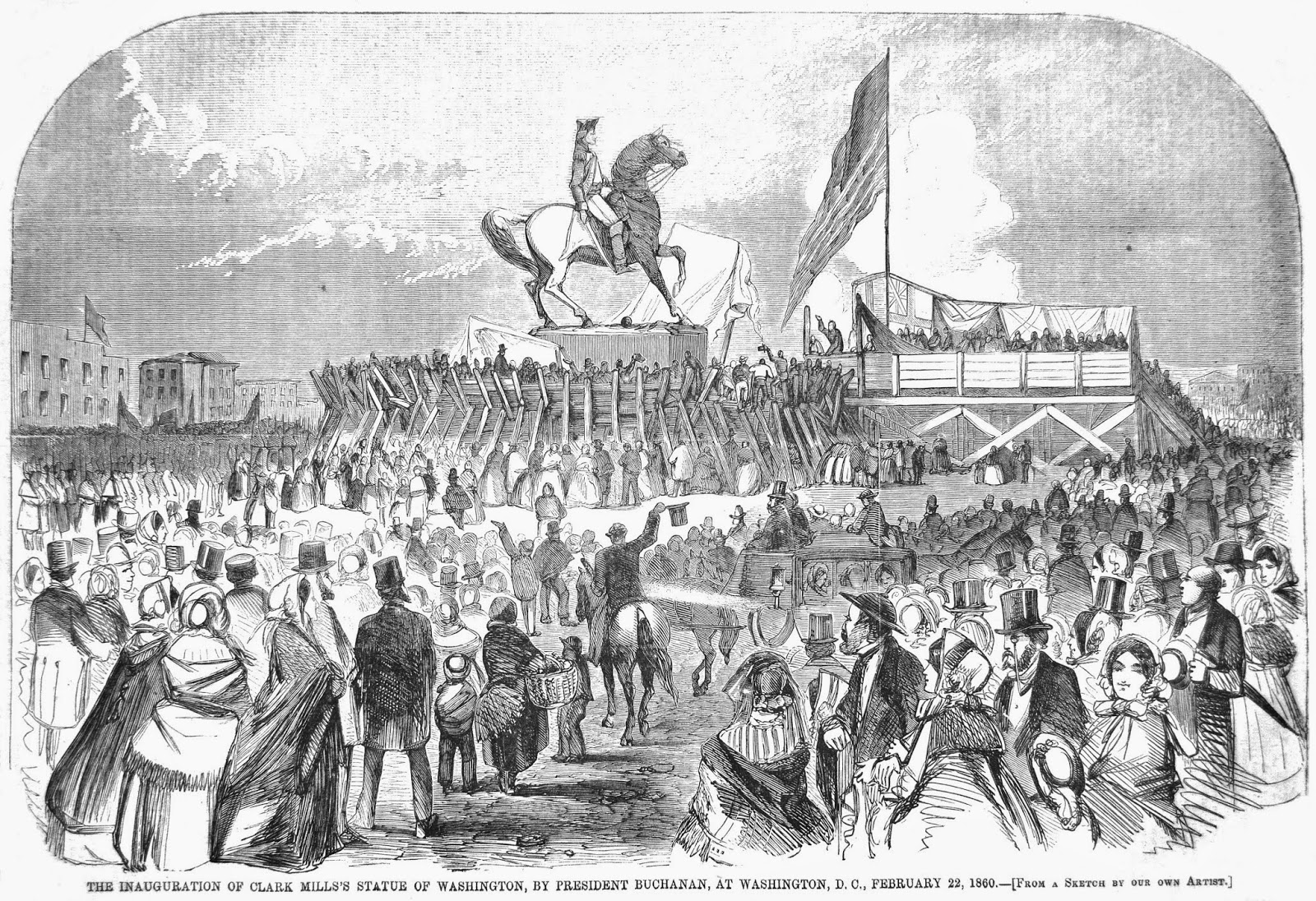
A sketch of the statue's unveiling ceremony which appeared in Harper's Weekly

On the morning of the ceremony, a significant amount of rain fell, causing Pennsylvania Avenue to be very muddy. Due to the weather and the delay of the 7th Regiment's arrival, the event was postponed until 3pm. A contingent met at the District of Columbia City Hall and proceeded to march up Pennsylvania Avenue to the statue. Those that participated in the march included a large number of active military members and veterans. Along Pennsylvania Avenue, building were decorated with flags and other patriotic items. When the marchers walked past the White House, President Buchanan and others joined them to the ceremony site. In total, the procession was approximately a half-mile long (0.8 km). When the ceremony began at 5pm, the temporary stands were full of people, as was the surrounding area.

Amongst the prominent attendees were the president, Vice President John C. Breckinridge, the Speaker of the House William Pennington, members of the Supreme Court and Senate, and foreign diplomats. Reverend Barnard H. Nadal began the ceremony with prayer. Senator James H. Hammond of South Carolina introduced U.S. Representative Thomas S. Bocock of Virginia, who would become the Speaker of the Confederate States Congress the following year, to give the keynote address. His remarks included the location of the statue was an "appropriate spot where the summer sunbeams latest linger, and where the breezes from the blue hills of [Washington's] own native and beloved Virginia delight to play." Following Bocock's speech, President Buchanan spoke. According to the National Park Service, "President Buchanan's remarks were far more foreboding: "May Washington City, which [Washington] founded, continue throughout many generations to be the seat of government of a great, powerful and united confederacy. Should it ever become a ruin by a dissolution of the Union, it will...teach the lesson to all the dwellers upon earth that our grand political experiment has failed, and that man is incapable of self-government..." Buchanan wore Washington's Masonic apron and used his gavel to officially dedicated the statue.

=== Later history ===
The surrounding area slowly developed after the statue was installed. Some improvements were made to the circle, including an iron fence replacing the wooden one in 1869, and in the 1880s, the hiring of a watchman to monitor and maintain the park. The park had 48 different species of trees by the early 1900s. When additional Revolutionary War statues were being installed on the corners of Lafayette Square, including the statue of the Comte de Rochambeau and the statue of Friedrich Wilhelm von Steuben, it was suggested the statue of Washington should be relocated to one of the corners. The plan also called for moving the equestrian Jackson statue to Washington Circle and renaming it Jackson Circle. Despite some support, the plan was eventually cancelled. Due to weather damage, in 1923 the Washington statue was taken to Roman Bronze Works for repairs. During this time, the plan to switch the memorials came up again, this time being supported by President Warren G. Harding. Because Jackson was a Democrat and the Washington statue was dedicated by Buchanan, a Republican, the changes were adamantly opposed by Southern Democrats, and the plan once again was cancelled.

In the early 1960s, the K Street underpass was built below Washington Circle. This required the removal of the statue. It was returned to its original location in 1963. On July 14, 1978, the Washington statue and 13 other Revolutionary War statues were collectively listed on the National Register of Historic Places (NRHP). The statues were added to the District of Columbia Inventory of Historic Sites (DCIHS) on March 3, 1979. In addition, the statue is a contributing property to the L'Enfant Plan, which was added to the DCIHS on November 8, 1964, and to the NRHP on April 24, 1997. In 2023, during the Gaza war, the statue was vandalized with the words "FREE GAZA" painted in red on the pedestal.

== Location and design ==
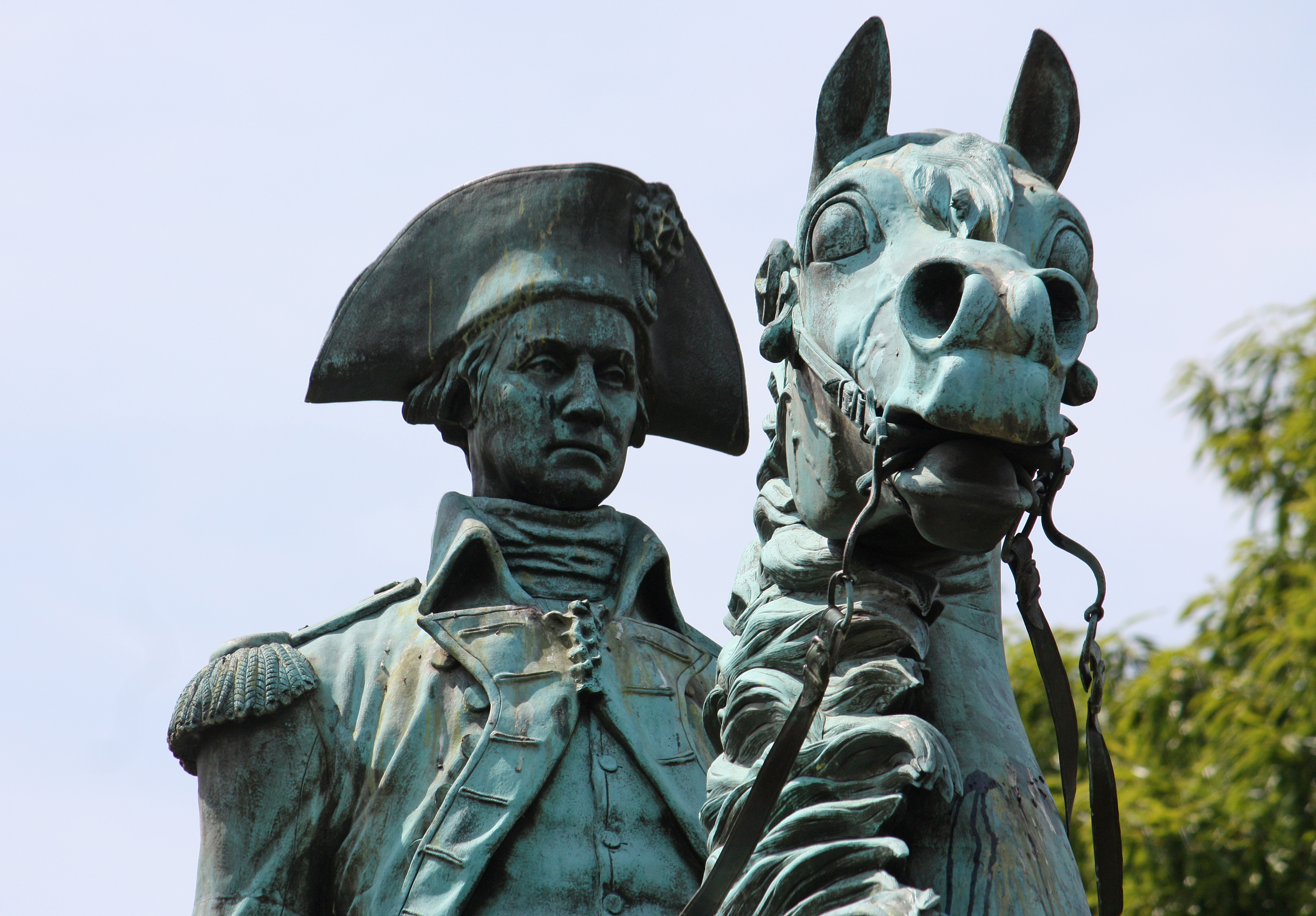
Details of Washington and the horse

The Washington statue is located on the city's Reservation 26, in the center of Washington Circle, a traffic circle and park in the Foggy Bottom neighborhood of Washington, D.C. The busy traffic circle is where 23rd Street, New Hampshire Avenue, and Pennsylvania Avenue NW intersect. K Street NW passes through in a tunnel under the circle. The circle is across the street from George Washington University Hospital and Schneider Triangle. The park and statue are both owned and maintained by the National Park Service.

The bronze statue of Washington and his horse is 9-feet tall (2.7 m), 14-feet long (4.3 m), and faces east towards the White House. Washington is depicted sitting erect and wearing his military uniform as Commander in Chief of the Continental Army. His face is modelled after the sculpture of Washington by Jean-Antoine Houdon. The uniform includes a long jacket with fringed epaulets and a three-cornered hat. He is holding a sword in his left hand and the right hand is holding the reins of his horse. He is approaching the opposing forces at the Battle of Princeton in 1777.

The wild horse is depicted as one that was taken from a prairie near Fort Leavenworth. It is standing on three legs and looks as if it has been startled. The horse's details including veins, a mane, and tail, have been admired by historians. There were critics as well who disliked the startled look on the horse's face compared to Washington's relaxed appearance. The statue stands on a marble pedestal measuring 9.8-feet tall (3 m) and 15-feet long (4.6 m). The pedestal has been repaired with cement when cracks appear. On the front (east side) of the pedestal, just below the statue, is the inscription "WASHINGTON". Also on the pedestal's east side is the inscription "CLARK MILLS/SCULPTOR". The name of the founder is located on the left leg of the horse.

== See also ==
- Cultural depictions of George Washington
- List of sculptures of presidents of the United States
- List of statues of George Washington
- List of public art in Washington, D.C., Ward 2
- National Register of Historic Places in Washington, D.C.
- Outdoor sculpture in Washington, D.C.
