= American Revolution Statuary =

Statuary in Washington D.C., United States

- U.S. National Register of Historic Places
- D.C. Inventory of Historic Sites
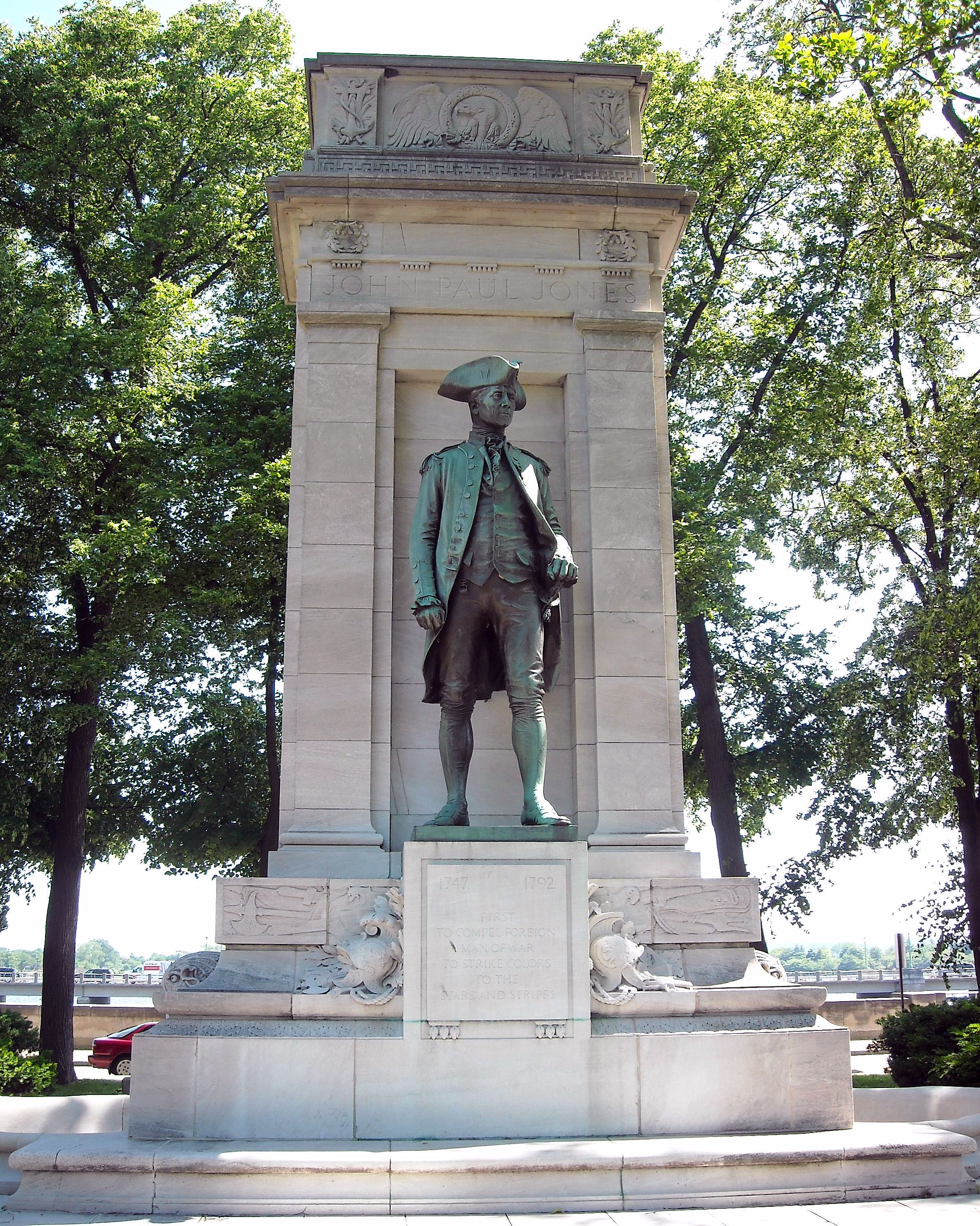
- John Paul Jones Memorial in West Potomac Park
- Location: Washington, D.C., U.S.
- NRHP reference No.: 78000256

Significant dates
- Added to NRHP: July 14, 1978
- Designated DCIHS: March 3, 1979

American Revolution Statuary is a group of fourteen statues in Washington, D.C., which honor men whose actions assisted the Thirteen Colonies in their fight against the Kingdom of Great Britain in the American Revolutionary War. The statues are spread throughout the city, except for four of the fourteen, which are located in Lafayette Square, across from the White House, that honor some foreign heroes from the Revolutionary War.

Some of the statues are located in prominent places, while others are in small parks or stand alone in front of buildings. All of the statues are owned and maintained by the National Park Service, an agency of the United States Department of the Interior. The statuary was collectively listed on the National Register of Historic Places (NRHP) in 1978 and the District of Columbia Inventory of Historic Sites the following year. In addition, most are also contributing properties to historic districts listed on the NRHP.

The first statue in Washington, D.C., honoring Revolutionary War heroes was the equestrian statue of President and General George Washington, which was installed in 1860. The remaining statues were erected from 1878 to 1948, with most being installed in the early 20th century. All but one of the statues are cast in bronze. Benjamin Franklin's statue was carved in marble. The statues depict American military men, two American politicians, and an eighth statue depicts a military man who was also governor of Massachusetts. Five statues depict European officers who aided the American cause, and a British politician who spoke out for the American cause. The U.S. Congress authorized the original placement of all the statues, and all but four were fully paid for with federal funds. Some of the statues have been moved from their original locations.

== History ==
=== 19th century ===
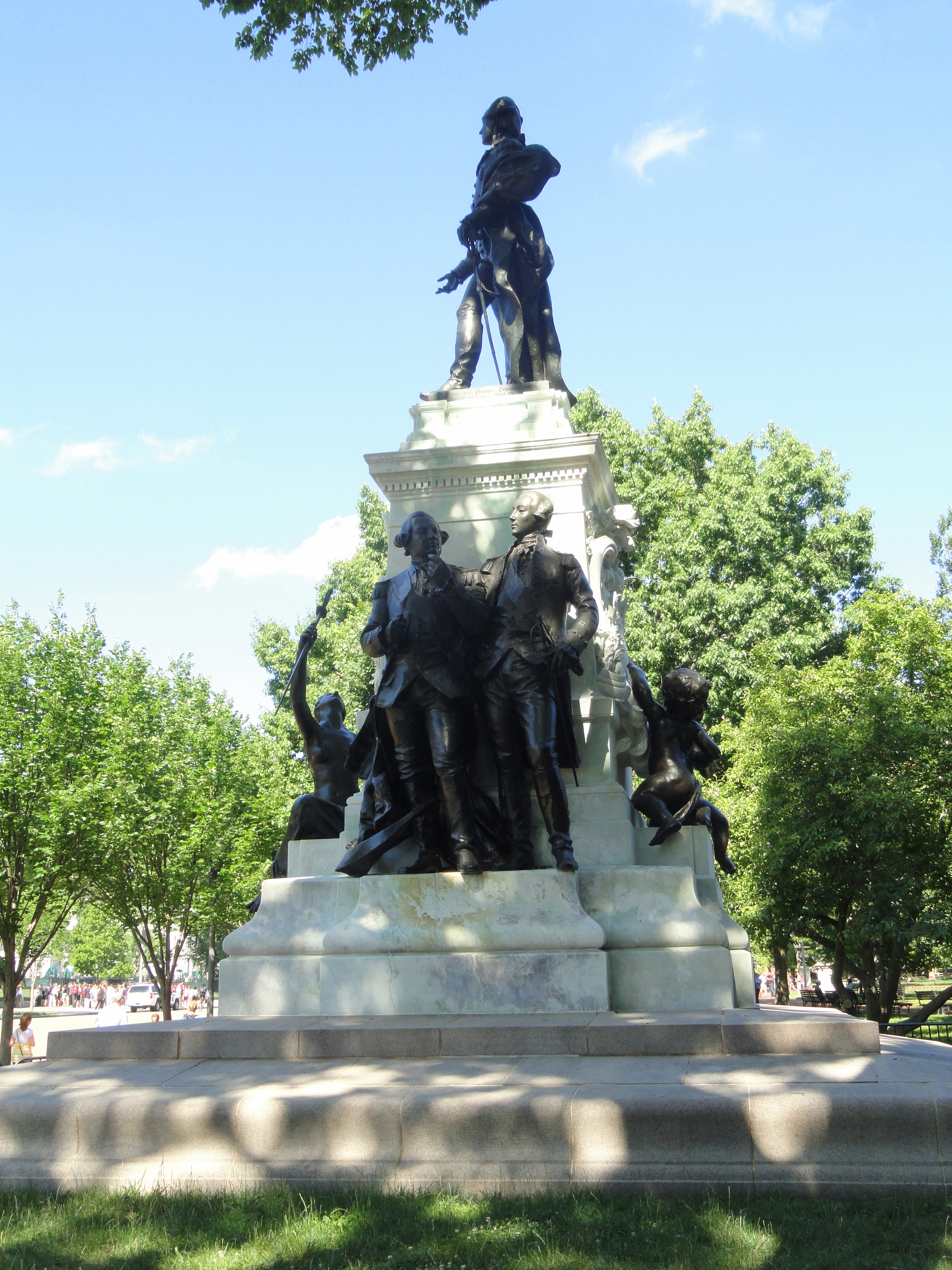
Statue of the Marquis de Lafayette in Lafayette Square, across from the White House

Beginning in the mid-1800s, Congress, societies, and descendants of the American Revolutionary War forces wanted to install statues throughout Washington, D.C., to honor notable men who helped the U.S. win independence from the Kingdom of Great Britain. The first outdoor statue in the nation's capital depicted Thomas Jefferson. It was displayed north of the White House in 1847, but was returned to the United States Capitol in 1874. In 1853, the equestrian statue of President Andrew Jackson was installed in the center of Lafayette Square. It was the first equestrian statue made in the U.S.

Clark Mills was commissioned to create an equestrian statue of George Washington, the country's first president and commander-in-chief of the Continental Army. The equestrian statue was installed in 1860 in Washington Circle, the first of the 14 American Revolutionary statuary to be erected in Washington, D.C. The next statue of a Revolutionary War hero was in honor of Major General Nathanael Greene, erected in 1878 in Stanton Park and designed by Henry Kirke Brown. It is considered one of the city's best equestrian statues. The third statue, depicting Benjamin Franklin in a standing pose, was sculpted by Jacques Jouvenal and installed in 1889. It was later moved to its current location in front of the Old Post Office. Franklin's statue is one of four of the statues not paid for by the U.S. government. It was a donation from Stilson Hutchins, founder of The Washington Post. The fourth statue installed, sculpted by Alexandre Falguière and Antonin Mercié, was in honor of Major General Gilbert du Motier, Marquis de Lafayette, one of two French military figures to be honored in Lafayette Square. It was erected in 1891. The park had been named after him during his 1824 visit to the U.S.

=== 20th century ===
The majority of the Revolutionary War statues were installed in the 20th-century. The first to be erected in the 20th-century, and the fifth overall, was that of Jean-Baptiste Donatien de Vimeur, comte de Rochambeau, in 1902. The statue of the Comte de Rochambeau was sculpted by Fernand Hamar and is the other French military hero honored in Lafayette Square.

The sixth statue, sculpted by William Couper, depicts Doctor John Witherspoon, a politician, minister, and signer of the United States Declaration of Independence. It was dedicated in 1909 and paid for by members of the Church of the Covenant (now known as National Presbyterian Church). It is located at the intersection of 18th Street, Connecticut Avenue, and N Street NW. The seventh and eighth statues, depicting Polish heroes Tadeusz Kościuszko and Casimir Pulaski, respectively, were dedicated on the same day in 1910. Kościuszko's statue, sculpted by Antoni Popiel, was the third installed in Lafayette Square and Pulaski's equestrian statue, sculpted by Kazimierz Chodziński, stands on the eastern end of Freedom Plaza after being moved several times in its history. Also in 1910, the statue of Friedrich Wilhelm von Steuben, sculpted by Albert Jaegers, was installed in Lafayette Square.

The John Paul Jones Memorial, honoring the Continental Navy captain, was sculpted by Charles Henry Niehaus and is located in West Potomac Park. It was erected in 1912 and became the tenth Revolutionary War statue to be installed. In 1914, another naval hero, Commodore John Barry, was memorialized with a statue in Franklin Square. His statue was sculpted by John J. Boyle. In 1922, the Sulgrave Institution represented by Charles Wakefield, 1st Viscount Wakefield, paid for a statue of Edmund Burke to be erected in a small park at the intersection of 11th Street, L Street, and Massachusetts Avenue NW. The statue honoring a British politician who defended the Thirteen Colonies was sculpted by James Havard Thomas and became the 12th Revolutionary War statue erected in Washington, D.C. The last two installed were the statue of Artemas Ward at Ward Circle, which was sculpted by Leonard Crunelle and dedicated in 1938, and the statue of Nathan Hale, a gift from Yale University President Charles Seymour, which was sculpted by Bela Pratt and dedicated in 1948.

Washington, D.C., has the largest amount of outdoor statues in the country. Two well-known landmarks in the city, the Washington Monument and Jefferson Memorial, are technically American Revolutionary monuments, but due to their size and grandeur, they are excluded from the list. All of the American Revolutionary statuary are owned and maintained by the National Park Service (NPS), an agency of the United States Department of the Interior. In accordance with Executive Order 11593, by President Richard Nixon, the NPS surveyed and registered statuary of people of the American Revolutionary War in Washington, D.C., to aid in their preservation. The statues were collectively listed on the National Register of Historic Places (NRHP) on July 14, 1978. The statuary was added to the District of Columbia Inventory of Historic Sites the following year on March 3, 1979. Due to their locations in places originally planned by Pierre Charles L'Enfant, many of the statues are contributing properties (CP) to the L'Enfant Plan. Others are CPs to historic districts, including the four at Lafayette Square, that are CPs to the Lafayette Square Historic District, a National Historic Landmark.

== List of statues ==
Image	Address	Year	Architect	Comments
	Lieutenant General George Washington; 38°54′8″N 77°3′1″W	1860	Clark Mills	Contributing property (CP) to the L'Enfant Plan.
	Major General Nathanael Greene; 38°53′37″N 76°59′59″W	1878	Henry Kirke Brown	CP to the L'Enfant Plan and the Capitol Hill Historic District.
	Benjamin Franklin; 38°53′40″N 77°1′40″W	1889	Jacques Jouvenal	CP to the L'Enfant Plan and the Pennsylvania Avenue National Historic Site.
	Major General Marquis Gilbert de Lafayette; 38°53′56″N 77°2′7″W	1891	Alexandre Falguière and Antonin Mercié	CP to the L'Enfant Plan and the Lafayette Square Historic District.
	Major General Comte Jean de Rochambeau; 38°53′56″N 77°2′16″W	1902	Fernand Hamar	CP to the L'Enfant Plan and the Lafayette Square Historic District.
	Doctor John Witherspoon; 38°54′25″N 77°2′29″W	1909	William Couper	CP to the L'Enfant Plan and the Dupont Circle Historic District.
	General Casimir Pulaski; 38°53′45″N 77°1′48″W	1910	Kazimierz Chodziński	CP to the L'Enfant Plan and the Pennsylvania Avenue National Historic Site.
	Brigadier General Thaddeus Kościuszko; 38°54′0″N 77°2′7″W	1910	Antoni Popiel	CP to the L'Enfant Plan and the Lafayette Square Historic District.
	Major General Friedrich Wilhelm von Steuben; 38°54′0″N 77°2′16″W	1910	Albert Jaegers	CP to the L'Enfant Plan and the Lafayette Square Historic District.
	Commodore John Paul Jones; 38°53′18″N 77°2′22″W	1912	Charles Henry Niehaus	CP to L'Enfant Plan and the East and West Potomac Parks Historic District.
	Commodore John Barry; 38°54′7″N 77°1′54″W	1914	John J. Boyle	CP to L'Enfant Plan.
	Edmund Burke; 38°54′14″N 77°1′38″W	1922	James Havard Thomas	CP to L'Enfant Plan and the Mount Vernon West Historic District.
	General Artemas Ward; 38°56′16″N 77°5′9″W	1938	Leonard Crunelle	
	Captain Nathan Hale; 38°53′33″N 77°1′28″W	1948	Bela Pratt	CP to the Pennsylvania Avenue National Historic Site.

== See also ==
- Civil War Monuments in Washington, D.C.
- National Register of Historic Places listings in Washington, D.C.
- Outdoor sculpture in Washington, D.C.
- Founding Fathers of the United States
