= Statue of Nathan Hale (Washington, D.C.) =

Statue by Bela Pratt

- Captain Nathan Hale
- U.S. Historic district – Contributing property
- D.C. Inventory of Historic Sites
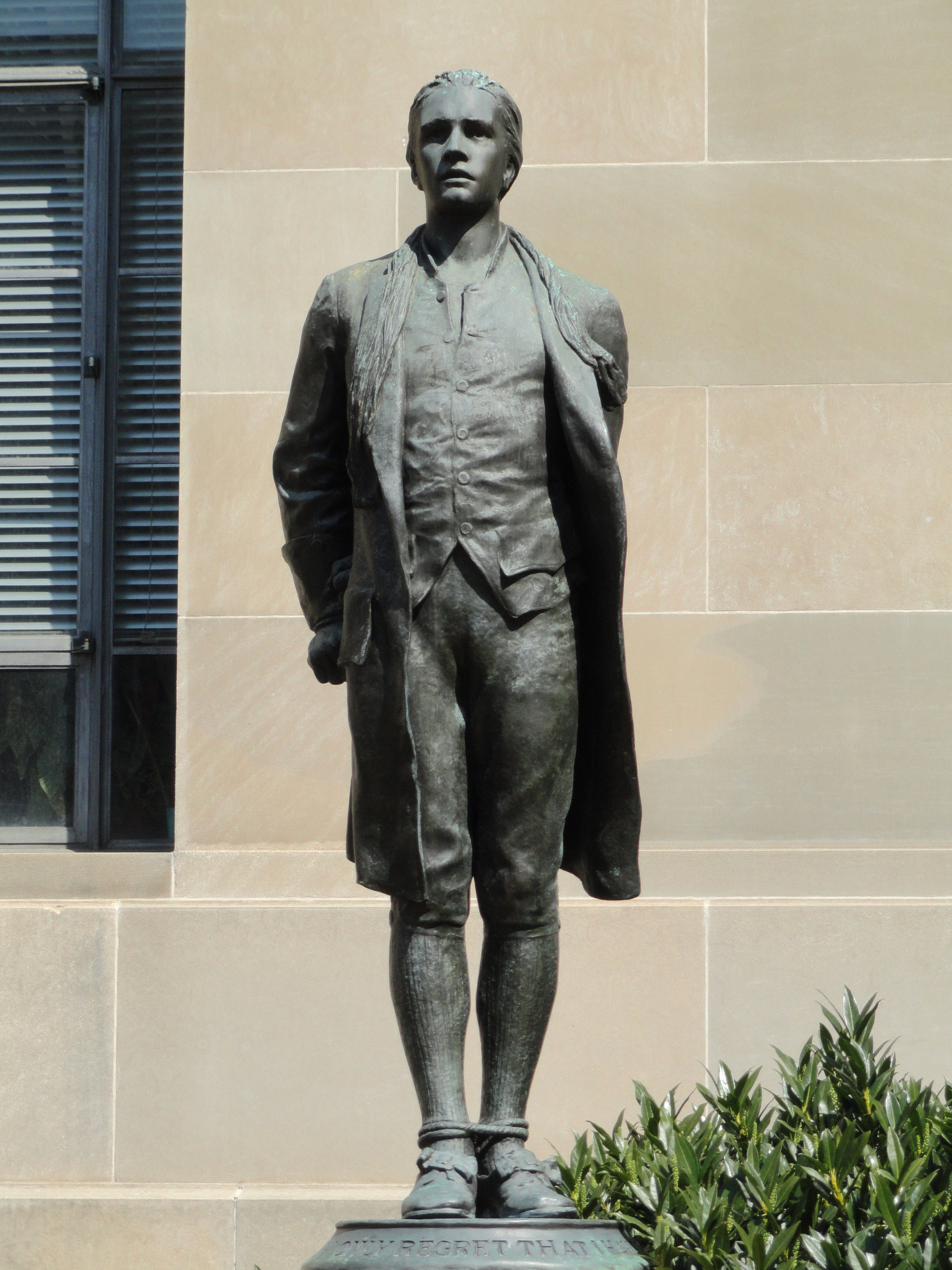
- Statue of Nathan Hale in 2013
- Location: 9th Street and Constitution Avenue NW, Washington, D.C., United States
- Coordinates: 38°53′33″N 77°1′28″W
- Built: 1914 (cast in 1930)
- Architect: Bela Lyon Pratt (scultpor); Douglas Orr (architect); Roman Bronze Works (founder)
- Part of: • Pennsylvania Avenue National Historic Site (78000256) • American Revolution Statuary (78000256)

Significant dates
- Designated CP: • October 15, 1966 (Pennsylvania Avenue National Historic Site) • July 14, 1978 (American Revolution Statuary)
- Designated DCIHS: • March 7, 1968 (Federal Triangle Historic District) • June 19, 1973 (Pennsylvania Avenue National Historic Site) • March 3, 1979 (American Revolution Statuary)

Captain Nathan Hale is a bronze statue of Nathan Hale (1755–1776), a schoolteacher from Connecticut, who enlisted in the Continental Army during the American Revolutionary War. He was stationed in Boston, but was later transferred to the New York City area. While in New York, Hale acted as a spy against the Kingdom of Great Britain's army. He posed as a teacher and was able to cross enemy lines to obtain military information. He left the area and before he could return home, his cousin, a Loyalist, informed the British about what Hale had done. He was captured and sentenced to death, with the hanging occurring the following day. While Hale was on the gallows, he gave a speech which ended with his famous quote: "I only regret that I have but one life to lose for my country."

The statue of Hale that stands in front of the Robert F. Kennedy Department of Justice Building, near the northwest corner of 13th Street and Constitution Avenue NW in Washington, D.C., was originally created in 1914 for Yale University, Hale's alma mater. The statue is a life-sized figure based on a design by sculptor Bela Lyon Pratt, with assistance from architect Douglas Orr and Roman Bronze Works. The cast for the duplicate statue was made in 1930. There are several of these statues located throughout the U.S. The cast of the statue in Washington, D.C., which was donated by attorney George Dudley Seymour, is bronze and the pedestal is granite. It was dedicated in April 1948.

The statue is one of 14 American Revolution statues in Washington, D.C., that were collectively listed on the National Register of Historic Places (NRHP) in 1978. The statue is also a contributing property to the Pennsylvania Avenue National Historic Site, also listed on the NRHP, and the Federal Triangle Historic District, listed on the District of Columbia Inventory of Historic Sites.

== History ==
=== Biography ===
Nathan Hale was born in 1755 in Coventry, Connecticut. He and his brother attended Yale College, and Nathan later graduated from Yale University. After graduating, Hale became a schoolteacher in East Haddam and New London, Connecticut. When news reached of the Battles of Lexington and Concord in April 1775, he resigned from teaching and reportedly said "Let us march immediately and never lay down our arms until we obtain our Independence." Hale then joined the Continental Army and was commissioned an officer. He was stationed in Massachusetts to besiege Boston then held by the Kingdom of Great Britain's military forces.

Hale was then stationed in the New York City area, when the British were in control of the city itself. In September 1776, Hale offered to work as a spy, gathering intelligence about the British forces on Long Island. To cross enemy lines, Hale posed as a schoolteacher and even carried his diploma as evidence. He was able to obtain some information and began his journey back to George Washington's headquarters. After he left enemy territory, he was betrayed by a Loyalist cousin and was arrested for spying before he could reach colonial forces. British Commander William Howe, 5th Viscount Howe, had Hale searched, and found military information Hale had gathered. The commander told Hale he would be hanged the following day. The statue depicts Hale on September 22, 1776, as he stood defiantly on the gallows. Before he died, Hale reportedly made a speech that ended with the phrase he's most known for in U.S. history: "I only regret that I have but one life to lose for my country."

=== Memorial and dedication ===
In 1893, the Sons of the Revolution dedicated the first statue to honor Hale, which was created by sculptor Frederick William MacMonnies. It was installed in New York City's City Hall Park, incorrectly chosen as the place where Hale was hanged. Bela Lyon Pratt was selected to create another sculpture of Hale, on behalf of Yale University, and it was installed in front of Hale's former dormitory, Connecticut Hall. Pratt used Crary Brownell, a local man, as a model for the statue because Brownell "closely resembled the profile [of Hale] that was on the door at the Nathan Hale home in Coventry." It wasn't until 1912 that the Hale Monument Commission (HMC) approved the statue and awarded Pratt a $15,000 prize. Afterwards, Pratt sent all members of the HMC small bronze replicas of the statue.

Pratt's statue was completed in 1913 but was unveiled the following year. A cast was made in 1930, one of several for various groups and government agencies. One of the statues stood in front of the Nathan Hale Homestead in Connecticut. It was installed by attorney George Dudley Seymour, who had purchased the homestead in 1914. In 1945, Seymour gifted the statue to the U.S. government. It wasn't until 1948 that the statue was installed and a dedication ceremony took place.

On April 18, 1948, Charles Seymour, president of Yale University, presented the statue to U.S. Attorney General Tom C. Clark in Washington, D.C. Amongst those in attendance was Connecticut Senator Brien McMahon, who served as master of ceremonies due to his authoring the Senate resolution which authorized the U.S. government to receive the gift. Also in attendance at the ceremony was fellow-Connecticut Senator Raymond E. Baldwin. Members of the Connecticut House of Representatives joined government officials and veteran groups at the event. During the ceremony, Clark said: "His heroic sacrifice has thrilled youth throughout the years. Every citizen of the United States has a sacred duty to guard and help preserve, in times of peace as well in time of war, the freedom for which Nathan Hale and other Americans have fought, and for which many of them have died."

=== Later history ===
The United States Postal Service used Pratt's statue on a 1925 postage stamp. The following year, a commemorative medal was created. The statue of Hale is one of 14 American Revolution statues that were collectively listed on the National Register of Historic Places (NRHP) on July 14, 1978. The following year the statues were added to the District of Columbia Inventory of Historic Sites (DCIHS). In addition, the Pulaski statue is a contributing property to the Pennsylvania Avenue National Historic Site, listed on the NRHP on October 15, 1966, and the Federal Triangle Historic District, listed on the DCIHS on March 7, 1968.

== Location and design ==
The statue is located in front of the Robert F. Kennedy Department of Justice Building, near the northwest corner of 13th Street and Constitution Avenue NW. Historian and author James Moore Goode described its location as "awkwardly situated" and that it "appears to be somewhat lost." The statue depicts Hale as he prepares to die for spying on British forces during the American Revolutionary War. His hands and feet are bound by rope, but Hale is standing straight up and staring ahead. Hale is wearing a coat, vest, britches, and a pair of shoes adorned with large buckles. His hair is in a ponytail. The bronze statue is 76 inches (193 cm) tall, resting on a granite pedestal that is 49.25 inches (125.1 cm) tall.

=== Inscriptions ===
The inscriptions read:
(Statue, near figure's proper left foot:)

B.L. PRATT

CAST BY

ROMAN BRONZE WORKS N.Y.

(Statue, near figure's proper right foot:)

REPLICA OF THAT
AT YALE UNIVERSITY

(Statue, around bottom rim:)

I ONLY REGRET THAT I HAVE BUT ONE LIFE TO LOSE FOR MY COUNTRY

(Base, front:)

NATHAN HALE

CAPTAIN
ARMY OF THE UNITED STATES
BORN AT COVENTRY CONNECTICUT
JUNE 6, 1755
IN THE PERFORMANCE OF HIS
DUTY HE RESIGNED HIS
LIFE A SACRIFICE TO
HIS COUNTRY'S LIBERTY
AT NEW YORK

SEPTEMBER 22, 1776

== Gallery ==
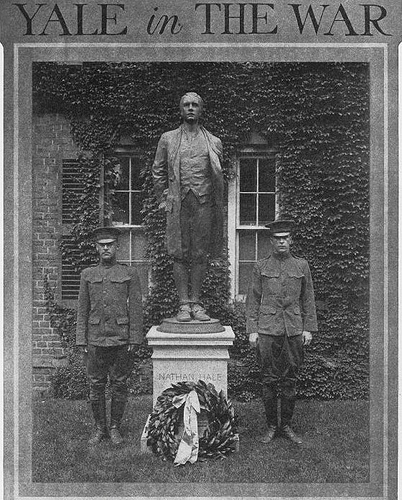
Yale University

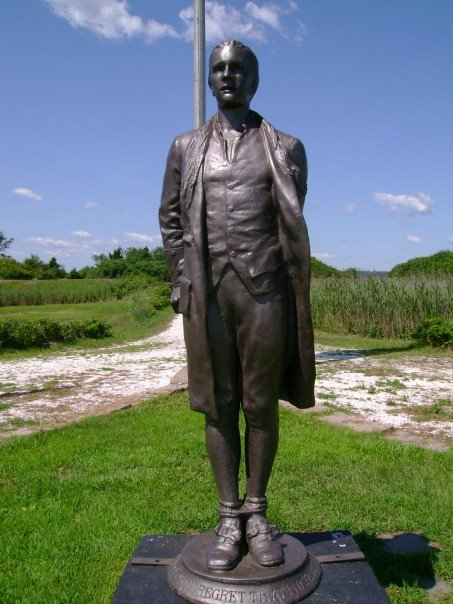
Fort Nathan Hale, New Haven, Connecticut

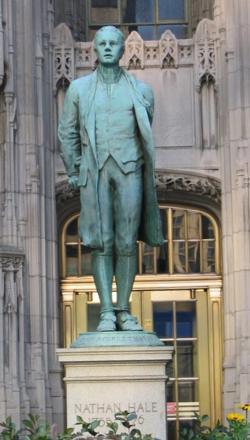
Replica in Chicago

== See also ==
- List of public art in Washington, D.C., Ward 6
- National Register of Historic Places in Washington, D.C.
- Outdoor sculpture in Washington, D.C.
