= Statue of the Marquis de Lafayette (Washington, D.C.) =

Statue by Alexandre Falguière in Washington, D.C.

- Major General Marquis Gilbert de Lafayette
- U.S. National Register of Historic Places
- U.S. National Historic Landmark District – Contributing property
- D.C. Inventory of Historic Sites
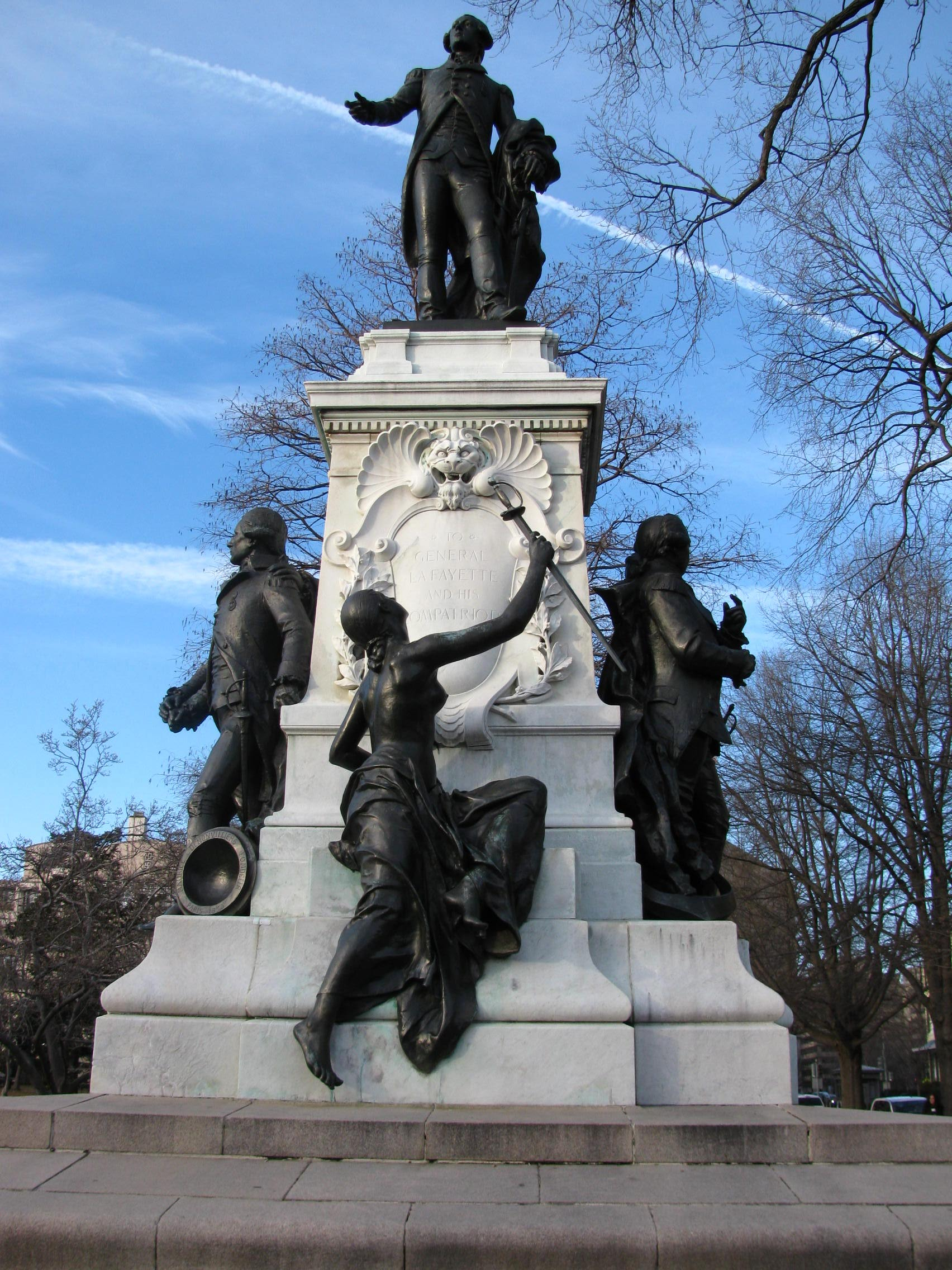
- South face of the statue of the Marquis de Lafayette in 2011
- Location: Lafayette Square, Washington, D.C.
- Coordinates: 38°53′56.5″N 77°2′7.3″W
- Built: 1891
- Architect: Alexandre Falguière and Antonin Mercié (sculptors); Paul Pujol (architect); Maurice de Nonvilliers (founder)
- Part of: American Revolution Statuary; Lafayette Square Historic District; L'Enfant Plan
- NRHP reference No.: 78000256 (American Revolution Statuary); 70000833 Lafayette Square Historic District; 97000332 (L'Enfant Plan)

Significant dates
- Added to NRHP: August 29, 1970 (Lafayette Square Historic District); July 14, 1978 (American Revolution Statuary); April 24, 1997 (L'Enfant Plan)
- Designated DCIHS: January 19, 1971 (L'Enfant Plan); June 19, 1973 (Lafayette Square Historic District); March 3, 1979 (American Revolution Statuary)

Major General Marquis Gilbert de Lafayette is a statue in the southeast corner of Lafayette Square, in Washington, D.C., near the intersection of Pennsylvania Avenue and Madison Place, across the street from the White House. The statue was erected in 1891 to honor Gilbert du Motier, Marquis de Lafayette, and his contributions in the American Revolutionary War. The square, originally part of the President's Park, was named in honor of the Marquis in 1824 during a visit he made to the U.S. The statuary was made by Alexandre Falguière and Antonin Mercié, and the architect who designed the marble pedestal was Paul Pujol. The monument comprises a bronze statue of the Marquis de Lafayette about 11 ft (3.4 m) high, standing on a French marble pedestal with four faces decorated with classical mouldings, accompanied by seven additional bronze statues, all larger than life size.

Lafayette's statue is one of 14 American Revolution Statuary in Washington, D.C., that were collectively listed on the National Register of Historic Places in 1978 and the District of Columbia Inventory of Historic Sites the following year. In addition, the statue is a contributing property to the L'Enfant Plan and the Lafayette Square Historic District, a National Historic Landmark.

== History ==
=== Biography ===
Gilbert du Motier, Marquis de Lafayette, was born in 1757 near Le Puy-en-Velay, France. His father, Michel du Motier, Marquis de La Fayette, was a colonel who died at the Battle of Minden when his son was only two years old. He was raised by his grandmother until his mother summoned him to Paris where they lived in the Luxembourg Palace. Lafayette attended school at the Lycée Louis-le-Grand. Around the time his mother and great-grandfather died in 1770, he was sent to train at a military institution, where he attained the rank of second lieutenant in the Musketeers of the Guard. A few years later, he married Adrienne de La Fayette.

Lafayette continued his education, attending the Académie de Versailles, and became a dragoons where he was commissioned a lieutenant in 1773. Two years later, in a meeting with Charles François de Broglie, Marquis of Ruffec, the American Revolutionary War was discussed. Lafayette was allegedly still angry at the British for the death of his father, and due to his new Masonic views, thought the idea of human liberty was admirable. In 1776, Lafayette joined a team of French military personnel that planned to travel to the Thirteen Colonies, and was commissioned a major general. The Continental Congress did not have enough money to bring Lafayette and others to the colonies, so Lafayette purchased the Victoire and sailed to America in early 1777.

By the end of the year, Lafayette had developed a strong bond with General George Washington, who became Lafayette's "adopted father." Amongst the battles where Lafayette participated are the Battle of Brandywine, the Battle of Barren Hill, and the Battle of Rhode Island. After the French officially joined the colonial forces fighting the Kingdom of Great Britain, Lafayette returned to France and helped enlist 6,000 soldiers. He returned to America in 1780. After assisting with several battles, Lafayette participated in the successful Siege of Yorktown, effectively ending the war.

Lafayette returned to France in 1782, where he was greeted as a hero. He returned to the United States a few years later to celebrate America's independence. During the French Revolution, he supported the cause and, along with Thomas Jefferson, wrote the first draft of the Declaration of the Rights of Man and of the Citizen. His eventual souring of the ideals of the revolution led to the Day of Daggers, which saw him defend King Louis XVI and experience a rise in popularity amongst a portion of the citizenry. After the king was overthrown, Lafayette fled and was later captured, spending five years in prison. He did not return to France until the reign of Napoleon had begun. He served ten years in the Chamber of Deputies and in 1824, after receiving an invitation from President James Monroe, returned to the U.S. He was the only surviving hero of the war and Lafayette was welcomed with great fanfare. During his visit, the park in front of the White House was landscaped and renamed Lafayette Square in his honor. Lafayette stayed in the country for a year, touring all of the states, before returning to France. He was once again elected to the Chamber of Deputies, drawing the ire of King Charles X. He spent his last years in France, supporting liberalism, and died in 1834 at the age of 76. In 2002, Lafayette became one of the few people to receive honorary citizenship.

=== Memorial ===
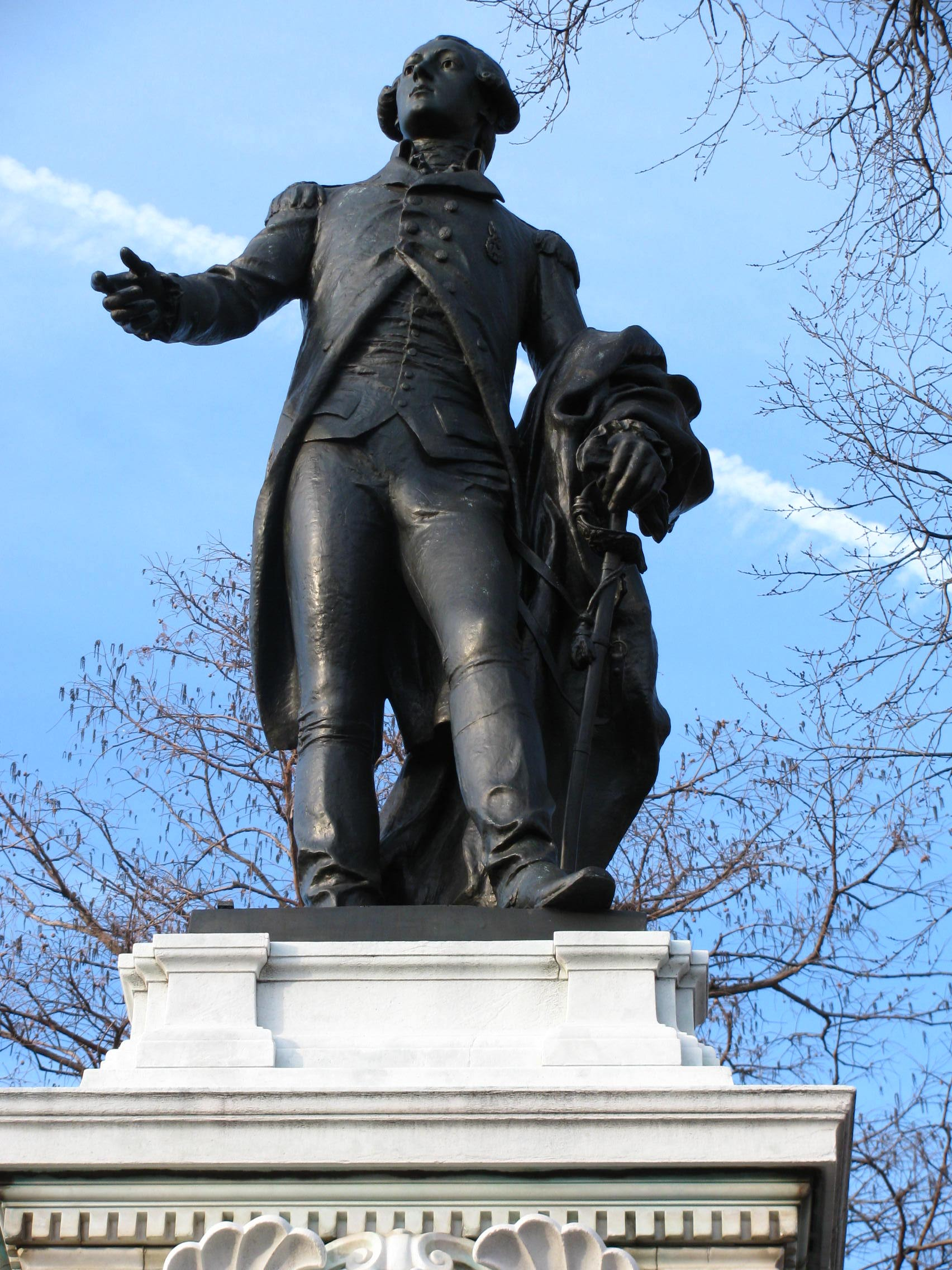
Statue of Lafayette

U.S. Senator John W. Johnston from Virginia made the first proposal to erect a statue of the Marquis Lafayette in Washington, D.C., initially suggesting an equestrian statue in January 1883. A less ambitious proposal was approved by an Act of Congress on March 3, 1885, (23 Stat. 508), which appropriated a budget of $50,000 for it as one of many monuments erected around the centennial of the American Revolution. A commission was created to select the design and site of the statue. The commission included Secretary of War William Crowninshield Endicott, Senators William J. Sewell and John Sherman, and Architect of the Capitol Edward Clark.

The commission received design proposals from five French and three American artists. Amongst the Americans were Daniel Chester French, who later completed the Lafayette Memorial in Brooklyn and a statue of Lafayette at Lafayette College in Easton, Pennsylvania, Larkin Goldsmith Mead, whose proposal was similar to the design eventually chosen, and Augustus Saint-Gaudens, who would not submit a design but suggested the names of Alexandre Falguière and Antonin Mercié to the commission. The three French artists were Frédéric Auguste Bartholdi, whose statue of Lafayette had been erected in New York City in 1876, submitted two designs, one considered too expensive and the other too plain, and Falguière and Mercié, who submitted four joint designs. After a somewhat long process, one of Falguière and Mercié's designs was selected in 1887.

Falguière and Mercié first modelled the statue in clay at a quarter scale, which was then cast in plaster, and scaled up to a full-size model, from which sand molds were created, and then cast in bronze in Paris in 1890 by the founder Maurice Denonvilliers. The French architect Paul Pujol designed the pedestal using marble from the quarry of Derville and Company. The completed bronze and marble parts were shipped on the steamer La Normandie in 30 heavy boxes weighing 62,500 lb (28,300 kg). The boxes arrived in New York City in August 1890, and were then transported by train to Washington, D.C.

The best location for the statue was a matter of some debate after it had been commissioned. One congressman told a reporter from The Washington Post "If anything should be done, it is that the name of the square should be changed to Jackson Square." He wanted the statue to be erected where the equestrian statue of John A. Logan now stands. Lafayette Square seemed the obvious place, but the prominent site at the center of the square was already occupied by an equestrian statue of Andrew Jackson. Other possible sites near the Treasury Building or the U.S. Capitol were considered, but eventually the granite foundation was laid directly to the south of the Andrew Jackson statue.

However, Senator William B. Bate of Tennessee, Andrew Jackson's home state, objected that aligning both statues on an axis with the White House would mean the sightline from the statue of Andrew Jackson to the White House would be blocked by the statue of the Marquis. Work was halted, and attention moved to a site to the southeast corner of the Treasury Building, at the junction of 15th Street and Pennsylvania Avenue, but Secretary of the Treasury William Windom objected. After further debate, the southeast corner of Lafayette Square was selected, and the granite foundation was moved from the center of the south side of Lafayette Square to a new location a few hundred feet further east. When the installation of the statue was completed in April 1891, there were no funds left to hold a dedication ceremony. The Sons of the Revolution lays a wreath annually on Lafayette's birthday, September 6; and the 200th anniversary of Lafayette's birth was celebrated in 1957.

=== Later history ===
Sons of the Revolution laying wreaths at the monument in 1922

Verdigris has been removed from the statue on numerous occasions, first in 1910 and second in 1921. A major cleaning of the statue and others in Lafayette Square took place in 1987, but it was noted that weather and time had made the marble discolored in places. The foundation and base were recaulked, and the statues were cleaned via air abrasion. The last known cleaning of the statue in 2000 noted weather damage. The monument has been vandalized on occasion, including pieces of the base statues being replaced after they were stolen.

The Lafayette statue is one of 14 American Revolution Statuary that were collectively listed on the National Register of Historic Places (NRHP) on July 14, 1978. The statuary was added to the District of Columbia Inventory of Historic Sites (DCIHS) the following year on March 3, 1979. Because of its location on a square planned by Pierre Charles L'Enfant, the statue is a contributing property to the L'Enfant Plan, listed on the NRHP and DCIHS on April 24, 1997, and January 19, 1971, respectively. In addition, the statue is a contributing property to the Lafayette Square Historic District, a National Historic Landmark which was added to the NRHP on August 29, 1970, followed by the DCIHS on June 19, 1973. The statue and surrounding park are owned and maintained by the National Park Service.

== Location and design ==
The Lafayette statue is located on the southeast corner of Lafyette Square, at the intersection of Madison Place and Pennsylvania Avenue NW, across the street from the White House and near the Freedman's Bank Building. It is one of four statues on each corner of Lafayette Square. The others being statues of Friedrich Wilhelm von Steuben, Comte de Rochambeau, and Tadeusz Kościuszko.

With its marble pedestal and granite foundation, the monument stands about 36 ft (11 m) high and 20 ft (6.1 m) wide. The monument rests on a base of American granite on a slight mound of grassed earth, within a circle of granite curb stones with a diameter of about 60 ft (18 m). The statue of Lafayette faces south towards the White House. He is depicted in civilian dress with a long coat bearing the badge of the Society of the Cincinnati, boots, and wig. He is gesturing with his right arm, with a cloak over his left arm and his left hand resting on the hilt of his sword. He is commonly interpreted to be petitioning the French National Assembly to assist the revolutionary Americans.

Before the south face of the pedestal is seated a draped female figure cast in bronze, symbolizing America, turning to seek aid from the Marquis and offering him a sword. A cartouche on the pedestal bears the inscription: "TO / GENERAL / LA FAYETTE / AND HIS / COMPATRIOTS / 1777–1783 / DERVILLE FARBRE". The east and west faces have pairs of bronze statues of French military figures associated with the American Revolutionary Wars. The east face has statues of Comte d'Estaing and the Comte de Grasse in military uniform, conversing, with an anchor symbolising their command of French naval forces, and the west face has statues of the Comte de Rochambeau and the Chevalier du Portail, also in military uniform, with a cannon symbolising their command of French armies. Apart from the Chevalier du Portail, all remained well-known revolutionary figures in the late 19th century. In 1890, The New York Times wrote that, "The commanders of the fleets are too well known to require comment, and Rochambeau is even better known...but Duportaille is not so familiar."

The north face has two bronze cherubs before a cartouche with a commemorative inscription, which reads: "BY THE CONGRESS / IN COMMEMORATION / OF THE SERVICES / RENDERED BY / GENERAL LAFAYETTE / AND HIS COMPATRIOTS / DURING THE STRUGGLE / FOR THE / INDEPENDENCE / OF THE UNITED STATES / OF AMERICA". A further inscription on the south side of the marble pedestal records the names of the creators of the statues and pedestal: "ALEXANDRE FALGUIERE / ANTONIN MERCIE / STATUAIRES / PAUL PUJOL / ARCHITECTE", and a reference to the French quarry that provided the marble: "DERVILLE ET C / MARBRES". An inscription around the rim of the cannon's mouth records the name of the Parisian founder that cast the bronzes: "MAURICE DENONVILLIERS FOUNDEUR / PARIS 1890", with another inscription cast into the base of the statue of the Marquis: "FONDU PAR MAURICE DENONVILLIERS".

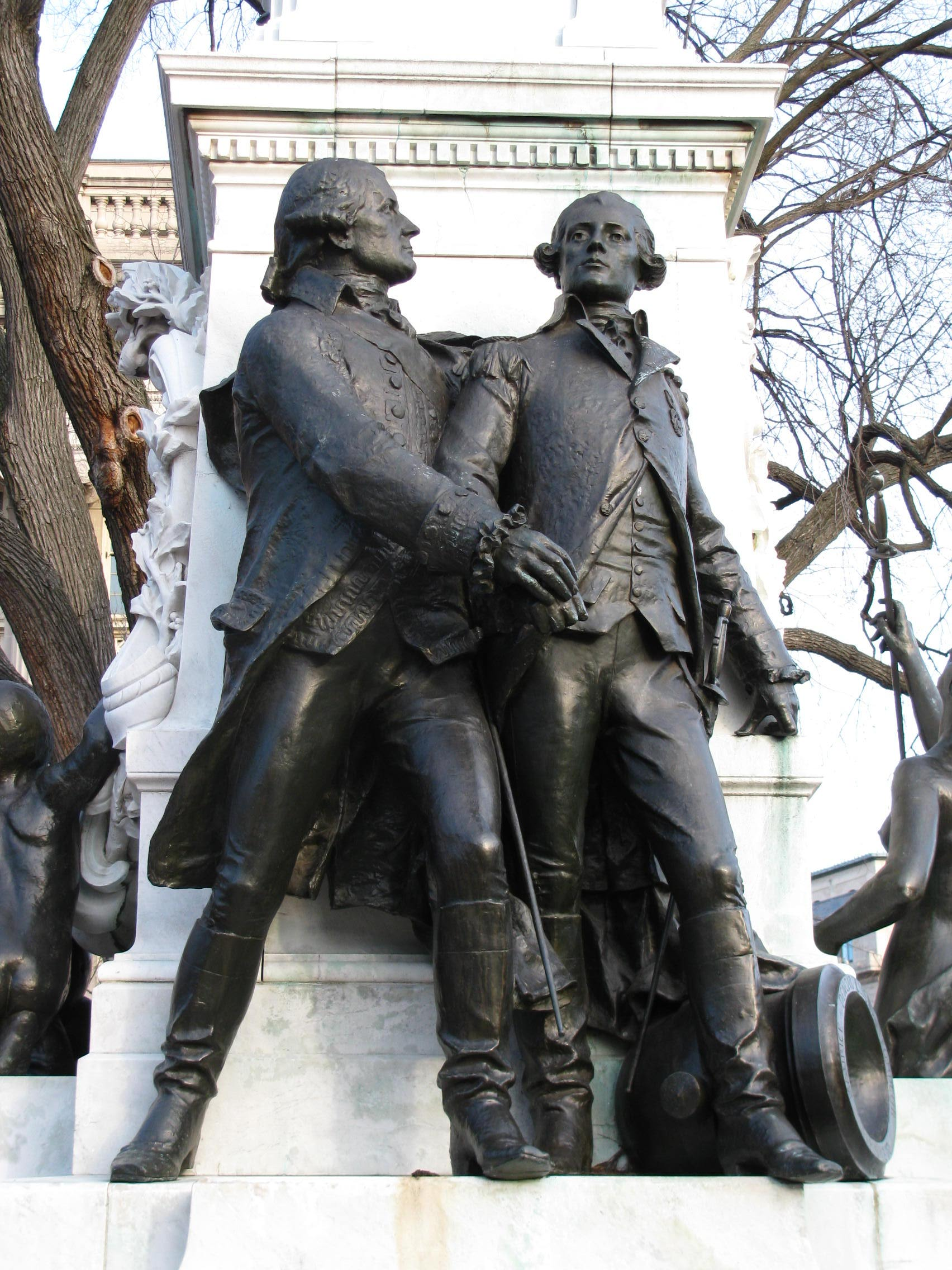
West face, with cannon

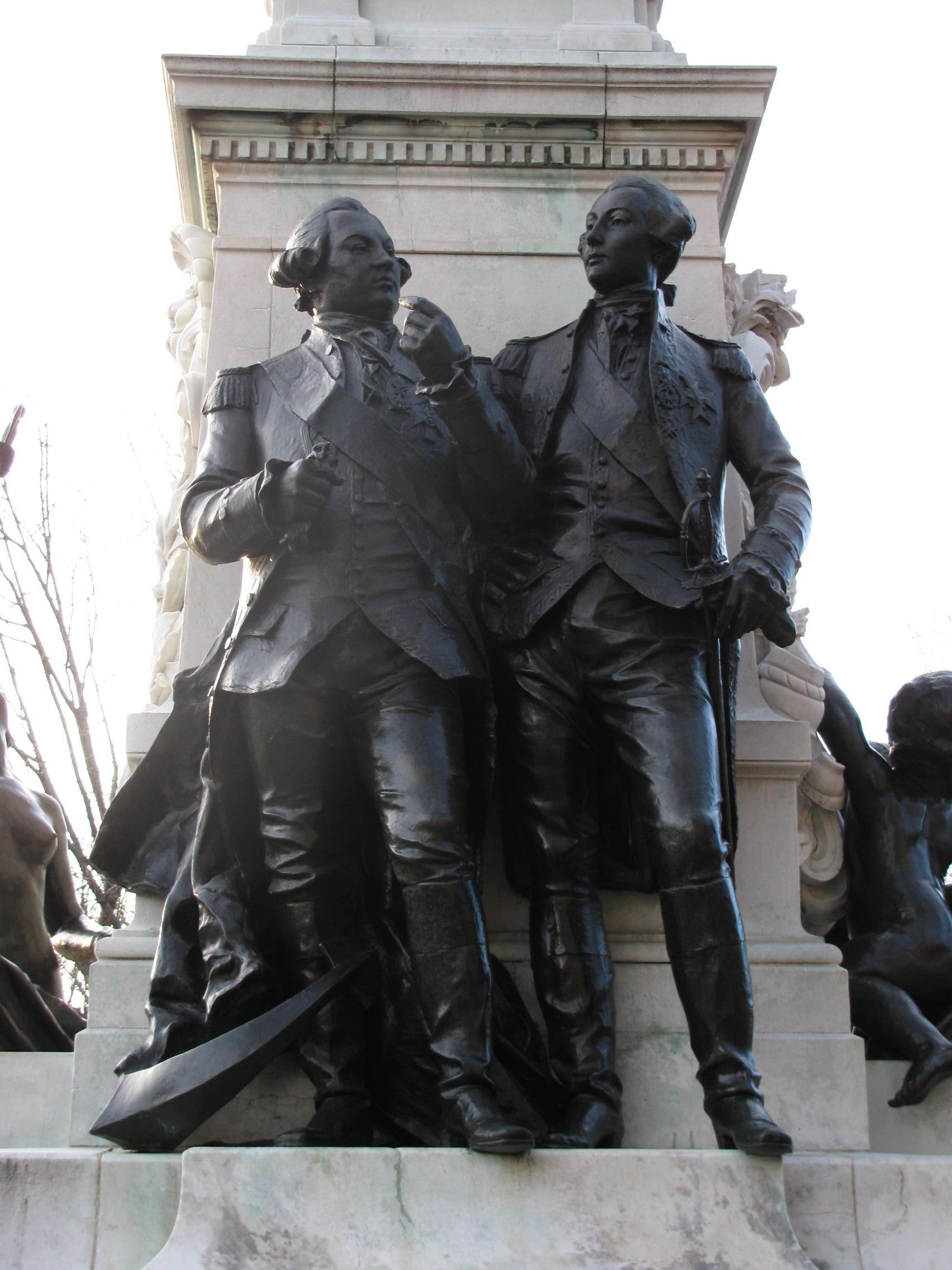
East face, with anchor

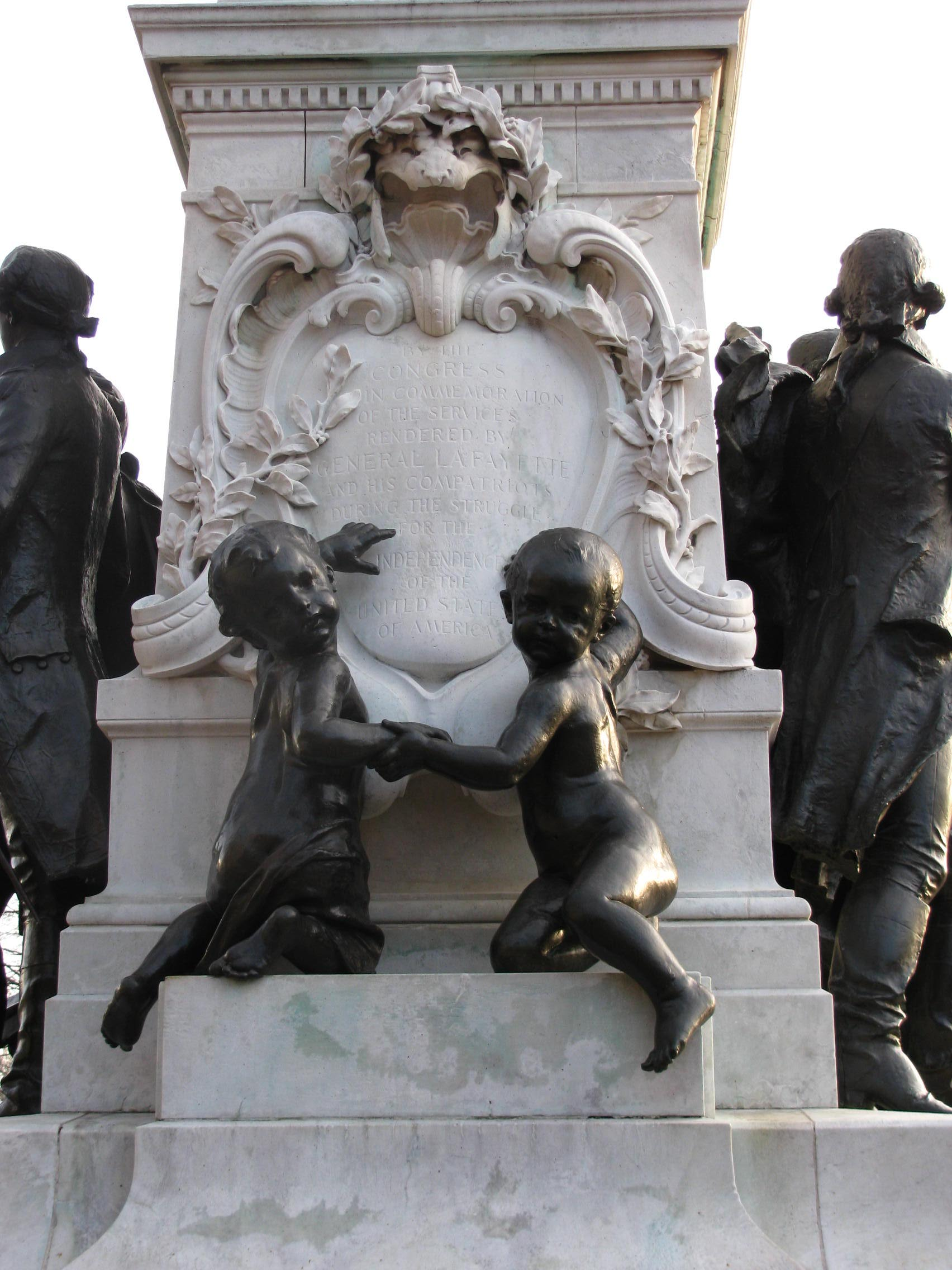
North face, with putti and cartouche

== See also ==
- Honors and memorials to the Marquis de Lafayette
- List of public art in Washington, D.C., Ward 2
- List of works by Alexandre Falguière
- National Register of Historic Places in Washington, D.C.
- Outdoor sculpture in Washington, D.C.
