= John Paul Jones Memorial =

Statue by Charles Henry Niehaus in Washington, D.C.

- Commodore John Paul Jones
- U.S. Historic district – Contributing property
- D.C. Inventory of Historic Sites
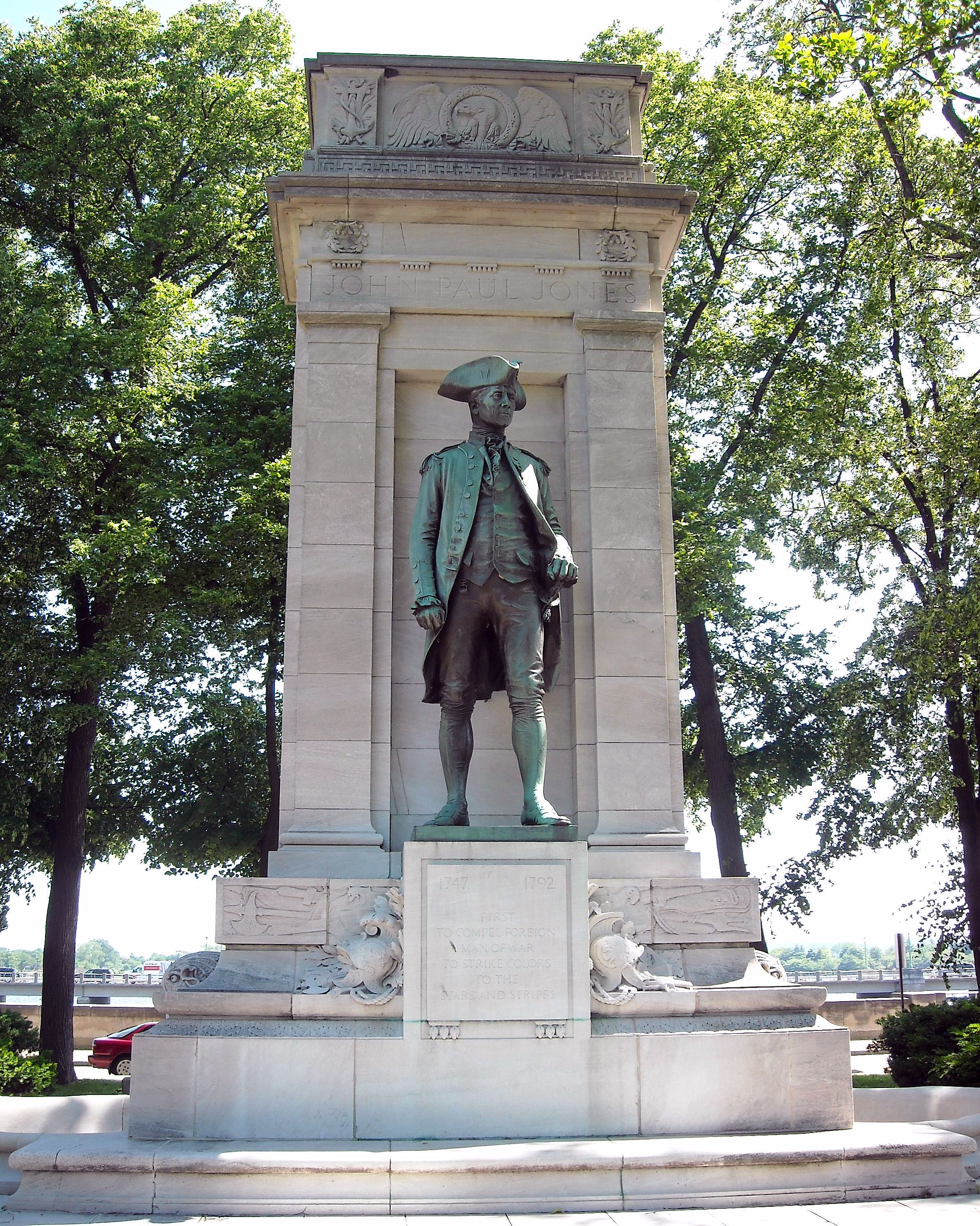
- John Paul Jones Memorial in 2008
- Location: Intersection of 17th Street and Independence Avenue SW, Washington, D.C.
- Coordinates: 38°53′17.63″N 77°2′22.2″W
- Built: 1912
- Architect: Charles H. Niehaus (sculptor); Thomas Hastings (architect)
- Part of: • American Revolution Statuary (78000256) • East and West Potomac Parks (73000217) • L'Enfant Plan (97000332)

Significant dates
- Designated CP: • July 14, 1978 (American Revolution Statuary) • February 6, 1985 (East and West Potomac Parks) • April 24, 1997 (L'Enfant Plan)
- Designated DCIHS: • November 8, 1964 (East and West Potomac Parks) • March 3, 1979 (American Revolution Statuary) • April 24, 1997 (L'Enfant Plan)

The John Paul Jones Memorial, also known as Commodore John Paul Jones, is a monument in West Potomac Park, Washington, D.C. The memorial honors John Paul Jones (1747–1792), the United States' first naval war hero, who received the Congressional Gold Medal after the end of the American Revolutionary War. Jones is famous for allegedly saying "I have not yet begun to fight!" during the Battle of Flamborough Head.

Born in Scotland as John Paul, he emigrated to the United States in the 1770s and added Jones to his name. He had been a seaman since the age of 13 and when war broke out with the United Kingdom of Great Britain and Ireland, he joined the Continental Navy. He was soon promoted to captain and commanded his first ship, the USS Providence, followed by the USS Ranger. After his decisive win at the Battle of Flamborough Head, he continued raiding ports and British ships, endearing him to French citizens. His last ship was the USS America, which he used to collect money from countries that owed debts. For his service in the war, Jones was awarded the Congressional Gold Medal, the only naval officer to receive one.

Jones died in France, and his grave was not discovered by Americans until 1905. His body was brought back to the United States, and there were immediate calls for a memorial to be erected in Washington, D.C., to honor one of the Revolutionary War's greatest heroes. Congress approved the memorial plans and allocated $50,000 for its installation. The dedication ceremony took place on April 17, 1912, with prominent attendees including President William Howard Taft, First Lady Helen Herron Taft, Navy Secretary George von Lengerke Meyer, and Horace Porter, who was responsible for locating Jones's grave. Charles H. Niehaus was the sculptor and Thomas Hastings, a partner in the Carrère and Hastings firm, was the architect.

The memorial is located at the terminus of 17th Street SW and Independence Avenue SW, near the Tidal Basin. The bronze statue, depicting Jones watching a battle while wearing a military uniform, stands on a tall marble pylon. Decorative elements include inscriptions, along with carved eagles and dolphins used in small fountains. The memorial is one of 14 sculptures in the American Revolution Statuary listed on the National Register of Historic Places and the District of Columbia Inventory of Historic Sites. It is also a contributing property to the East and West Potomac Parks Historic District and the L'Enfant Plan.

== Biography ==
John Paul Jones was born John Paul in Kirkcudbrightshire, Scotland, in 1747. He began working on ships at age 13. He emigrated to Virginia in 1774 and added Jones to his surname. Jones sided with the colonials when the American Revolutionary War began. He joined the Continental Navy in 1775, obtaining the rank of lieutenant thanks to influential friends. He was promoted to captain not long after, commanding USS Providence and USS Ranger, which he used to conduct successful raids on British ports and ships.

Jones was given a French ship which he renamed USS Bonhomme Richard (Poor Richard), in honor of Benjamin Franklin, whom the French admired. In 1779, Jones encountered two British warships, Countess of Scarborough and HMS Serapis, and successfully won the Battle of Flamborough Head. It was during this battle that Jones allegedly told British Captain Richard Pearson the famous words, "Surrender? I have not yet begun to fight!" after his ship received heavy damage. Jones's popularity with the French resulted in his not returning to the colonies until 1781.

After returning to the colonies, Jones was given command of USS America. At the conclusion of the war, the United States selected Jones to retrieve money owed to American citizens. He was awarded the Congressional Gold Medal for his service in the war, the only such medal awarded to someone from the Navy. After the war, he worked for the naval forces in other countries. He was a Rear Admiral in the Imperial Russian Navy for a time. In 1792, Jones died in Paris and was buried in the Saint Louis Cemetery. Following years of search for his grave, it was brought back to the United States in 1905, and later entombed in the Naval Academy Chapel in 1913.

== Memorial plans ==
After his remains were brought back to the United States, there were immediate calls for a monument honoring the nation's first naval hero. A few years earlier in 1902, Representative Frank D. Currier introduced a bill in Congress that would authorize the erection of a memorial at a cost of $50,000. In his statement before the House of Representatives, Currier said: "While there is so much talk at present about our great naval heroes we should not forget the first great American naval commander. There is no more interesting character in our history than Paul Jones, and it is a shame that there is not at the Capital of the nation a suitable monument to his memory." It was not until 1909 that Congress passed a bill to erect the memorial on public land and allocated $50,000 for its installation.

The sculptor chosen for Jones' statue was Charles H. Niehaus, whose other well-known works include the Samuel Hahnemann Monument in Washington, D.C., the statue of James A. Garfield in Cincinnati, the Apotheosis of St. Louis in St. Louis, and numerous works in the National Statuary Hall Collection and the Connecticut State Capitol. The architect for the memorial was Thomas Hastings, a partner in the Carrère and Hastings firm. John Grignolai was selected to carve the ornamentations on the memorial's pedestal and the Gorham Manufacturing Company casts the statue.

== Dedication ==
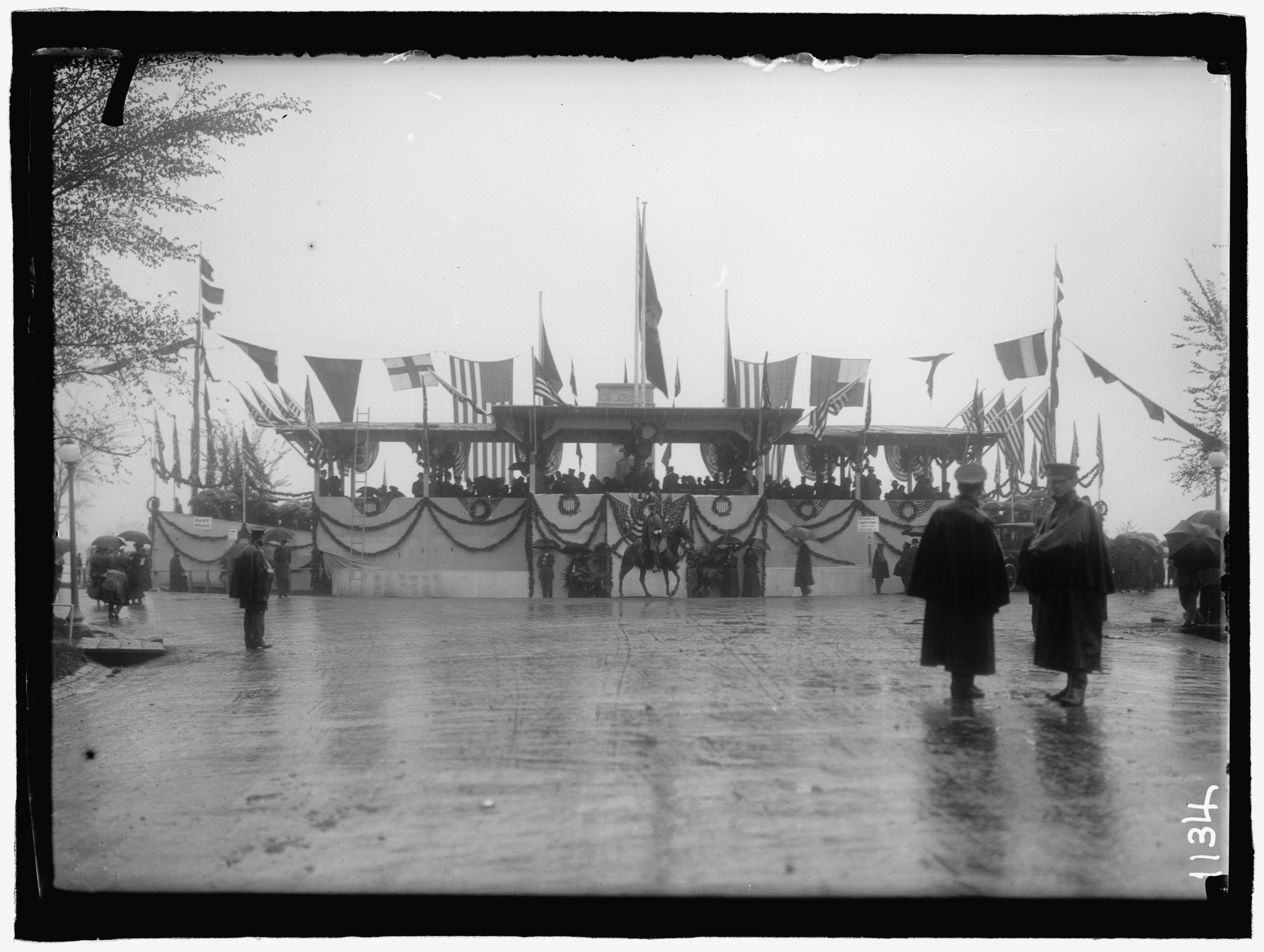
The stand partially surrounding the memorial, which can be seen in the background, at the dedication ceremony

On the day of the dedication ceremony, April 17, 1912, thousands of people stood in the rain to watch the procession and unveiling. Navy Secretary George von Lengerke Meyer presided over the event and spoke during the introduction, followed by Reverend Charles Wood giving the invocation. There were three stands on different sides of the memorial, with a capacity for over 1,000 people. The Marine Band stood behind the memorial, playing patriotic music. In the Tidal Basin, located behind the memorial, seven ships of the Navy were stationed for the event.

Horace Porter, who helped locate Jones's tomb while serving as U.S. ambassador to France, spoke next. He called Jones a "rugged sailor, and yet a polished courtier" who could "tread the ballroom floor as gracefully as the bloody deck of the frigates." The unveiling was done by Admiral George Dewey, a naval hero of the Spanish–American War. After this, there was a 21-gun salute, followed by remarks from President William Howard Taft that praised Jones's life and career. Niehaus was then introduced to the crowd. The closing remarks were given by Reverend William T. Russell. British Ambassador James Bryce, 1st Viscount Bryce, was supposed to attend the event, but due to the sinking of the Titanic which had occurred two days prior, he was busy dealing with the crisis.

The ceremony ended with a procession of 2,500 members of the Navy and Army walking past the memorial, reviewed by President Taft, First Lady Helen Herron Taft, and Colonel Spencer Cosby. The contingent, led by Grand Marshal Brigadier General Robert K. Evans, included midshipmen, Marines, and seamen. Army members of the contingent included soldiers in the United States Cavalry, Army National Guard, and Field Artillery Branch.

== Later history ==
On November 8, 1964, the East and West Potomac Parks Historic District, of which the Jones memorial is a contributing property, was added to the District of Columbia Inventory of Historic Sites (DCIHS). The statue is one of fourteen sculptures included in the American Revolution Statuary that were collectively listed on the National Register of Historic Places (NRHP) on July 14, 1978, and added to the DCIHS on March 3, 1979. The memorial is also a contributing property to the L'Enfant Plan's listing on the NRHP and DCIHS. It was added to the DCIHS on January 23, 1997, and the NRHP on April 24, 1997.

== Location and design ==
=== Location ===
The memorial is located in West Potomac Park, at the intersection of Independence Avenue SW and 17th Street SW in Washington, D.C. Located on the northern edge of the Tidal Basin, the memorial stands south of the World War II Memorial on the National Mall.

=== Design ===
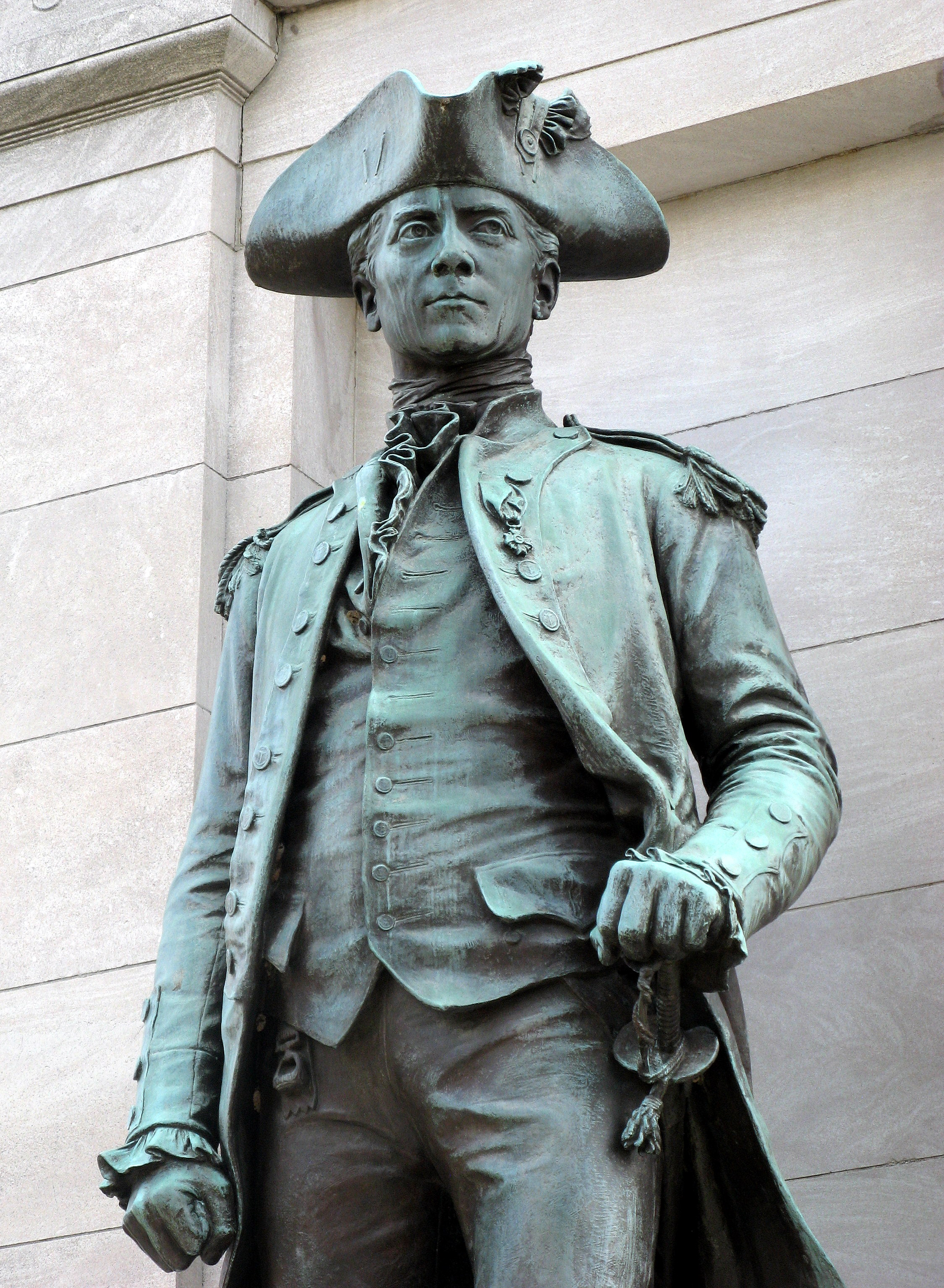
Closeup view of the statue

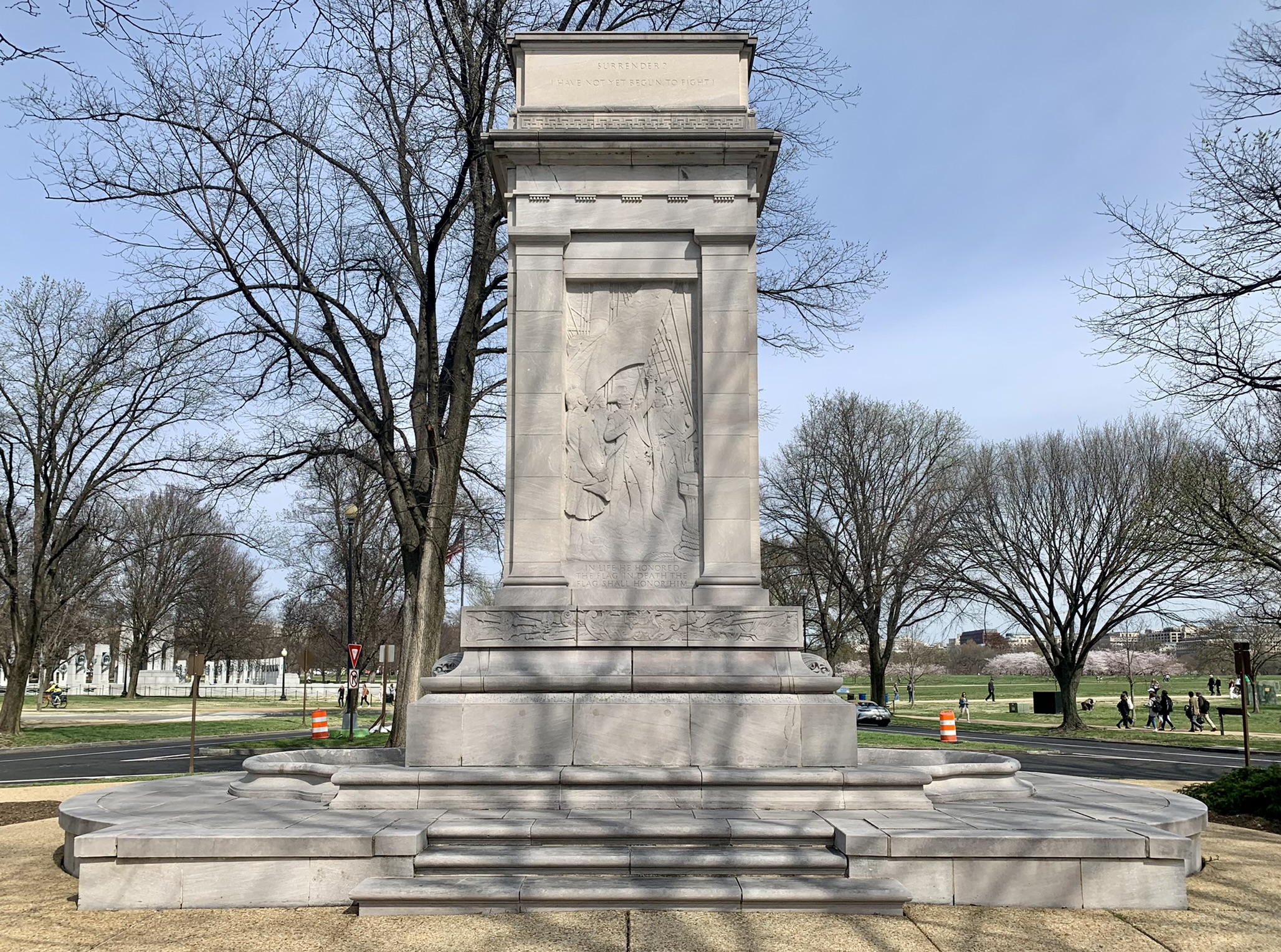
Rear view of the memorial

The bronze statue of Jones is approximately 10.8 feet tall (3.3 m), 3.2 feet wide (1 m), and 3.6 feet deep (1.1 m). He is depicted standing and watching a naval battle from Bonhomme Richard's deck. He is wearing a colonial military uniform, including a three-pointed hat, a coat, and a vest. His left leg is slightly ahead of the body. His left hand is resting on a sword and the right hand is in a fist, relaxing by his side. The statue stands in front of a 15-foot (4.6 m) pylon made of marble. At the top of the pylon are carvings of an eagle with a wreath, and decorative anchors on each side of the eagle. Two small wreaths are just above the inscription of Jones's name. At the base of the pylon are carved helmets, battle instruments, and foliage. The back of the pylon features a relief of Jones hoisting a flag on a British warship. There are three steps on the north and south faces of the memorial, each side featuring carved dolphins spouting water into a basin. There is a relief panel above each dolphin depicting axes, swords, and other battle equipment.

=== Inscriptions ===
Inscriptions on the memorial include the following words:

(north side of pylon, above statue)
JOHN PAUL JONES

(statue platform, left side)
C.H.NIEHAUS Sc.
1911

(statue platform, right side)
Gorham Co. Founders
(base, north side)
1747. 1792.
FIRST
TO COMPEL FOREIGN
MAN-OF-WAR
TO STRIKE COLORS
TO THE
STARS AND STRIPES

(pylon, south side above relief)
SURRENDER?
I HAVE NOT YET BEGUN TO FIGHT!

(pylon, south side below relief)
IN LIFE HE HONORED
THE FLAG. IN DEATH THE
FLAG SHALL HONOR HIM

== See also ==
- List of public art in Washington, D.C., Ward 2
- National Register of Historic Places in Washington, D.C.
- Outdoor sculpture in Washington, D.C.
- United States Navy Memorial
