= Statue of the Comte de Rochambeau =

Statue by Fernand Hamar in Washington, D.C.

- Major General Comte Jean de Rochambeau
- U.S. National Historic Landmark District – Contributing property
- D.C. Inventory of Historic Sites
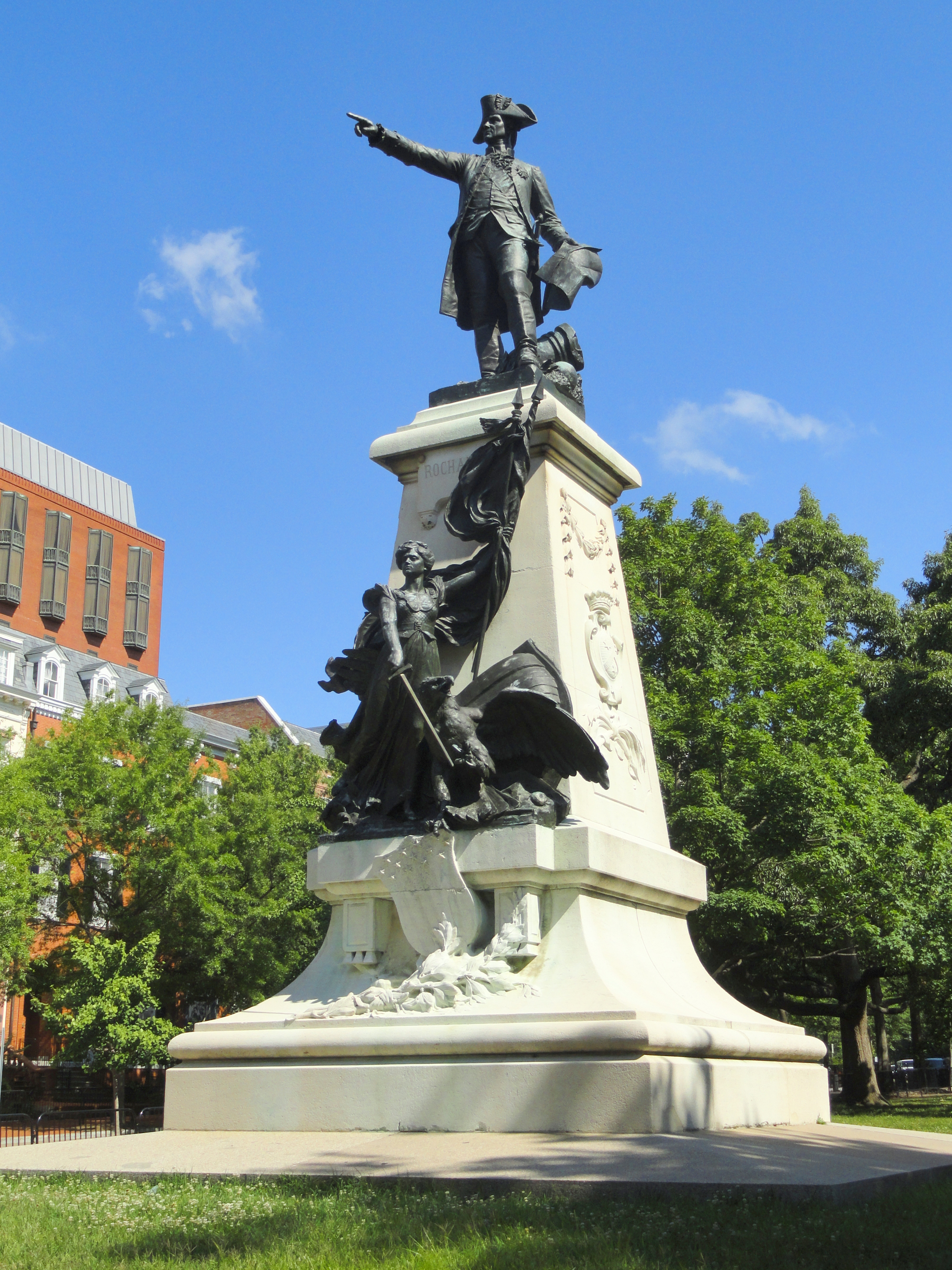
- The Rochambeau statue in 2012
- Location: Lafayette Square, Washington, D.C.
- Coordinates: 38°53′56.44″N 77°2′15.83″W
- Built: 1902
- Architect: • Fernand Hamar (sculptor) • L. Laurant (architect) • Ferdinand Gaussen (stonework) • Val d'Osne Foundry (founder)
- Part of: • Lafayette Square Historic District (85000238) • American Revolution Statuary (78000256) • L'Enfant Plan (97000332)

Significant dates
- Designated NHLDCP: • August 29, 1970 (Lafayette Square Historic District) • July 14, 1978 (American Revolution Statuary) • April 24, 1997 (L'Enfant Plan)
- Designated DCIHS: • January 19, 1971 (L'Enfant Plan) • June 19, 1973 (Lafayette Square Historic District) • March 3, 1979 (American Revolution Statuary)

Major General Comte Jean de Rochambeau is a bronze statue honoring Jean-Baptiste Donatien de Vimeur, comte de Rochambeau, a French nobleman and general who played a major role in helping the Thirteen Colonies win independence during the American Revolutionary War. Rochambeau joined the French military as a teenager; he participated in the War of Austrian Succession, after which he was promoted to colonel, and the Seven Years' War. During the war in America, Louis XVI asked him to lead a force of 5,500 French soldiers to assist the fight against the Kingdom of Great Britain. He and George Washington later worked together in the successful siege of Yorktown. He led the Army of the North during the French Revolutionary Wars, but was arrested and almost executed during the Reign of Terror. His military rank was restored by Napoleon, and he died a few years later in 1807.

In the late 1800s, a plan was made to erect four statues in Lafayette Square, Washington, D.C., honoring foreign heroes of the war. The statue of Rochambeau was the second one erected. French embassy official Jules Boeufvé worked tirelessly to have the statue installed, a replica of the original statue in Vendôme, France, and Congress authorized the plan in 1901. The following year, sculptor Fernand Hamar's replica was delivered to the United States. A base was also installed with additional statuary.

The dedication took place on May 24, 1902, with thousands of invited guests and onlookers in attendance. Among those who spoke during the unveiling and dedication ceremony were President Theodore Roosevelt, French General Joseph Brugère, French Ambassador Jules Cambon, and members of Congress. After the festivities in Washington, D.C., the French delegation was taken on a train tour of places where Rochambeau had spent time.

The statue has often been cleaned to remove verdigris, but a portion of the inscriptions has faded due to weather. The statue rests on a tall base adorned with two figures: a woman depicting Victory who is holding a sword and two flags, and an eagle beside her. Rochambeau's statue is one of 14 American Revolution Statuary in Washington, D.C., that were collectively listed on the National Register of Historic Places in 1978 and the District of Columbia Inventory of Historic Sites the following year. In addition, the statue is a contributing property to the L'Enfant Plan and the Lafayette Square Historic District, a National Historic Landmark.

== History ==
=== Biography ===
Jean-Baptiste Donatien de Vimeur, comte de Rochambeau, was born in 1725 in Vendôme, France. When he was 17, Rochambeau joined the French military and received praise from his commanding officers for his conduct in the War of Austrian Succession, leading to a promotion to colonel at 21 years old. The next decade he fought in the Seven Years' War. When the American Revolutionary War broke out, Rochambeau was near retirement from the military, where he held the rank of lieutenant general. In 1780, Louis XVI requested he participate in the Expédition Particulière, which would see 5,500 French soldiers fight alongside the Continental Army against the Kingdom of Great Britain.

Rochambeau and his forces sailed for 70 days before reaching Newport, Rhode Island, where the soldiers quickly built fortification. Commander-in-Chief of the Continental forces, General George Washington, wanted Rochambeau to attack British General Henry Clinton's forces in New York. Rochambeau did not agree to the plan because the French Navy had not arrived to assist him. He thought the Southern Colonies should be the next focus of the war. After promised troops and navy forces did not arrive by the following year, Rochambeau agreed to Washington's plan to attack British forces in New York. However, with the arrival of Admiral François Joseph Paul de Grasse and additional French troops, both Washington and Rochambeau chose to attack General Charles Cornwall in Virginia.

The combined French-American forces traveled south via the Washington–Rochambeau Revolutionary Route. It was in Virginia where the Siege of Yorktown took place, with 12,000 troops encircling British forces. The British surrendered in October 1781, essentially marking the end of the war. Rochambeau returned to France in 1783 and several years later commanded the Army of the North during the French Revolutionary Wars. He was awarded the distinction Marshal of France in 1791 and retired to Vendôme the following year. During the Reign of Terror, Rochambeau was almost executed in 1794 after being imprisoned and stripped of his military rank. Once Napoleon came to power, his military rank was restored. A few years later, Rochambeau died in 1807.

=== Memorial plans ===
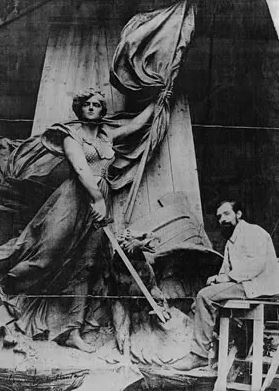
Fernand Hamar working on the statue

After the installation of the statue of the Marquis de Lafayette in Lafayette Square, Washington, D.C., in 1891, plans were made to erect three more statues to honor foreign heroes of the American Revolutionary War. The statue of Rochambeau would become the second memorial installed in the square. In Vendôme, sculptor Fernand Hamar had created a statue of Rochambeau that was unveiled in June 1900. Before the unveiling took place, there were already plans to make a replica for Lafayette Square. French embassy official Jules Boeufvé had been contacting U.S. senators since April of that year, asking them to have a replica of the Rochambeau statue brought to the United States. He said the cost would be around $7,500.

U.S. Senator George P. Wetmore introduced an amendment on May 23, 1900, to allocate $10,000 for the installation of the statue, but the bill did not make it past committee meetings, which had already reduced the funding to $7,500. Boeufvé asked the U.S. ambassador to France, Horace Porter, to send a letter of support for the statue. A few months later Porter wrote a letter to the chairman of the U.S. House Committee on Appropriations, which stated: "At the request of Mr. Boeufvé, of the French Embassy in the United States, I beg to say that I participated, on June 4th last, at Vendôme, in the unveiling of the statue of Rochambeau by the French artist Fernand Hamar, and that I found it to be a spirited and excellent work of art. It seems to me that it would be very appropriate and would give great satisfaction, if means were found to erect in Washington, D.C., a replica of the Marshal’s Statue."

U.S. Representative James McCleary introduced a bill the following February that allocated $7,500 for the statue. That bill failed, but U.S. Senator Henry C. Hansbrough introduced another one which was ultimately successful. The Act of Congress passed on March 3, 1901. Out of the 24 bills to erect memorials in Washington, D.C., that came before Congress from 1899 to 1903, only four others were approved. Boeufvé was noted for his help and determination in having Congress authorize the installation.

In total, $42,500 was appropriated by Congress for the transportation and installation of the statue, a base for the statue, and the traveling expenses for Rochambeau's family, Lafayette's family, and French government officials. The Rochambeau Monument Commission, consisting of McCleary, Wetmore, Secretary of State John Hay, and Secretary of War Elihu Root, was created to select a site for the statue, as well as planning its unveiling. In December 1901, Hamar finished the replica. Architect L. Laurant designed the base, Ferdinand Gaussen carved the stonework, and Val d'Osne Foundry was responsible for the founding.

=== Dedication ===
In addition to the aforementioned families and officials, President Theodore Roosevelt and Congress officially invited French citizens to the statue's unveiling, which would take place on May 24, 1902. That date was chosen because it was the anniversary of when Rochambeau joined the military. French President Emile Loubet received a letter of invitation in March of that year. He assigned a delegation of officials to attend the ceremony, including General Joseph Brugère and Vice Admiral Ernest François Fournier. Amongst the French civil delegation was Hamar and his father, in addition to the Rochambeau and Lafayette families. Rear Admiral Raymond P. Rodgers and Third Assistant Secretary of State Herbert H. D. Peirce were amongst the U.S. delegation that were appointed to assist the French guests of honor.

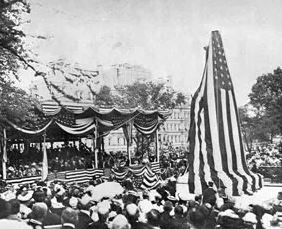
Dedication of the statue in 1902

The French delegation arrived in New York City on May 17, 1902, and began their travel to the nation's capital. On May 20, U.S. Navy ships, consisting of the USS Olympia, the USS Kearsarge, and the USS Alabama, greeted the French battleship Gaulois in Annapolis, Maryland. The delegation visited Mount Vernon in Virginia the day before the unveiling ceremony. Later that night, they attended state dinners at the French embassy and at the White House.

On May 24, 1902, thousands of guests in addition to thousands of members of the public gathered in Lafayette Square for the unveiling. Temporary stands were built by the statue for guests of honor, each one a patriotic color. The red stand was reserved for U.S. House members, the white stand reserved for U.S. Senate members along with patriotic groups, and the blue stand reserved for the French delegation, President Roosevelt, his cabinet, justices of the U.S. Supreme Court, and diplomats. The statue was draped with French and U.S. flags and two soldiers from each country stood at the statue's corners.

Roosevelt and his cabinet members were led from the White House to the statue by soldiers dressed in colonial military uniforms. When he arrived to the site, the crowd cheered. The invocation was given by Reverend Dr. Stafford followed by an address from the president, which was often interrupted with loud applause. Countess Rochambeau then pulled the cords, unveiling the statue, while an artillery salute took place and the United States Marine Band played the French national anthem, La Marseillaise. There was a loud applause and then Hamar was introduced to the crowd. This was followed by speeches from Ambassador Jules Cambon, Senator Porter, Senator Henry Cabot Lodge, and by Brugère, who said Entre vous, entre nous; à la vie, à la mort. ("Between you, between us; To life, to death.") After the ceremony, the French delegation was taken on a tour of places Rochambeau had spent time, including West Point, Niagara Falls, Newport, and Boston.

=== Later history ===
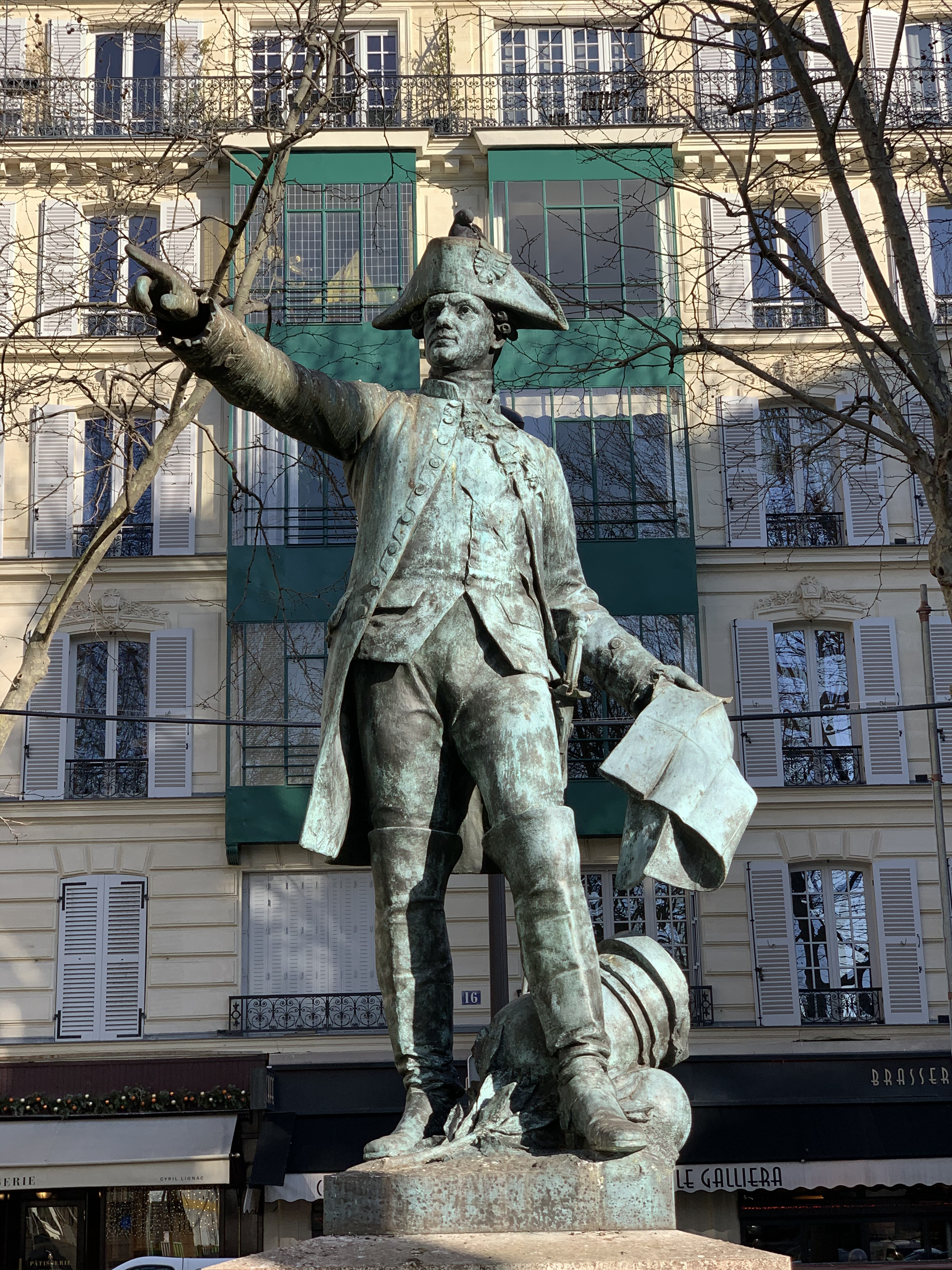
Replica of the statue in Paris

There was interest shown in creating a commemorative book covering the statue and its unveiling. In February 1904, Congress passed a resolution to create one and to print 10,000 copies, intended for those that were at the ceremony. The book, Rochambeau: A Commemoration by the Congress of the United States of America of the Services of the French Auxiliary Forces in the War of Independence, was written by De Benneville Randolph Keim.

The statue in Washington, D.C., is not the only replica of Hamar's design. The second replica is located on Avenue Pierre 1er de Serbie in Paris. It was installed in November 1933. The third replica, in Newport, was installed on July 13, 1934. The original statue was destroyed by Nazis during World War II. The Society of the Cincinnati raised funds for a fourth replica that replaced the original. It was installed in 1974.

Verdigris has been removed from the statue on numerous occasions, beginning in 1910. A major cleaning of the statue and others in Lafayette Square took place in 1987. In addition, the foundation and base were recaulked. Although the statue has been somewhat easy to upkeep, the base and its inscriptions have not fared as well. Over time, weather has caused many of the inscriptions to be illegible. A few pieces from the granite and base statue have broken off throughout the years.

The Rochambeau statue is one of 14 American Revolution Statuary that were collectively listed on the National Register of Historic Places (NRHP) on July 14, 1978. The statuary was added to the District of Columbia Inventory of Historic Sites (DCIHS) the following year on March 3, 1979. Because of its location on a square planned by Pierre Charles L'Enfant, the statue is a contributing property to the L'Enfant Plan, listed on the NRHP and DCIHS on April 24, 1997, and January 19, 1971, respectively. In addition, the statue is a contributing property to the Lafayette Square Historic District, a National Historic Landmark which was added to the NRHP on August 29, 1970, followed by the DCIHS on June 19, 1973. The statue and surrounding park are owned and maintained by the National Park Service.

== Location and design ==
Lafayette Square is seen on the left, across the street from the White House

The Rochambeau statue is located on the southwest corner of Lafayette Square, at the intersection of Pennsylvania Avenue and Jackson Place NW, in Washington, D.C. The statue is across from the White House to the south and the Peter Parker House to the west. The statue is one of four that are sited on Lafayette Square's four corners. In the center of the park is the equestrian statue of Andrew Jackson.

The statue is made of bronze and the base is granite. The statue is 8-feet tall (2.4 m) and the diameter is 6 feet (1.8 m). The base is 20-feet tall (6.1 m) and 12-feet 2-inches (3.7 m) on all four sides. Rochambeau is depicted standing and pointing south into the distance with his right hand, showing his troops where to go. His left hand is holding papers that contain plans for the siege of Yorktown. He is wearing a Marshal of France uniform, including a three-pointed hat and the cockade of France, and a Order of the Saint Esprit medal. His sword is on his left side. Behind his left foot are a cannonball and cannon and laurels are in front of his feet.

Below Rochambeau are two bronze figures on the pedestal, which are not on the original statue. The woman dressed in armor represents Liberty, and holds a sword in her left hand, and the flags of France and the United States with her right hand. The sword is protecting an eagle, one of the national symbols of the United States. There are waves at the bottom of these two figures, depicting the woman and eagle standing on the bow of a ship while the wind is blowing, which symbolizes France arriving to help the colonies in their fight for independence. The eagle is clutching a shield made of granite that is adorned with the thirteen stars and stripes of the original U.S. flag. The granite wreath of laurels near the bottom of the base represents peace.

The neoclassical-style base is composed of three tiered sections. The top section underneath Rochambeau is pyramidal-shaped and become square-shaped as it moves down to the second tier. On this top tier, in addition to the Victory and eagle statues, are decorative granite shields on the east and west sides. The Rochambeau family crest is on the east shield and the coat of arms of France on the west shield. Both shields have a crown and garland above them and laurels below them. The second tier is also pyramidal-shaped until reaching the third tier, which is square-shaped. The statue is standing on a mound of grass measuring 55-feet in diameter (16.8 m).

The inscriptions read:
(Sculpture of Liberty, front near base:)

FONDU PARLE PAL D'OSNE 58 RUE VOLTAIRE

F. HAMAR

(Base, north face:)

We have been
contemporaries
and
fellow labourers
in the cause
of liberty
and we have lived
together
as brothers should do
in harmonious friendship
WASHINGTON TO ROCHAMBEAU
February 1, 1784

(Base, north face, bottom:)

BY THE CONGRESS
MAY XXIV MDCCCCII

(Base, front below sculpture of Rochambeau:)

ROCHAMBEAU

== See also ==
- List of public art in Washington, D.C., Ward 2
- National Register of Historic Places in Washington, D.C.
- Outdoor sculpture in Washington, D.C.
