= Outdoor sculpture in Washington, D.C. =

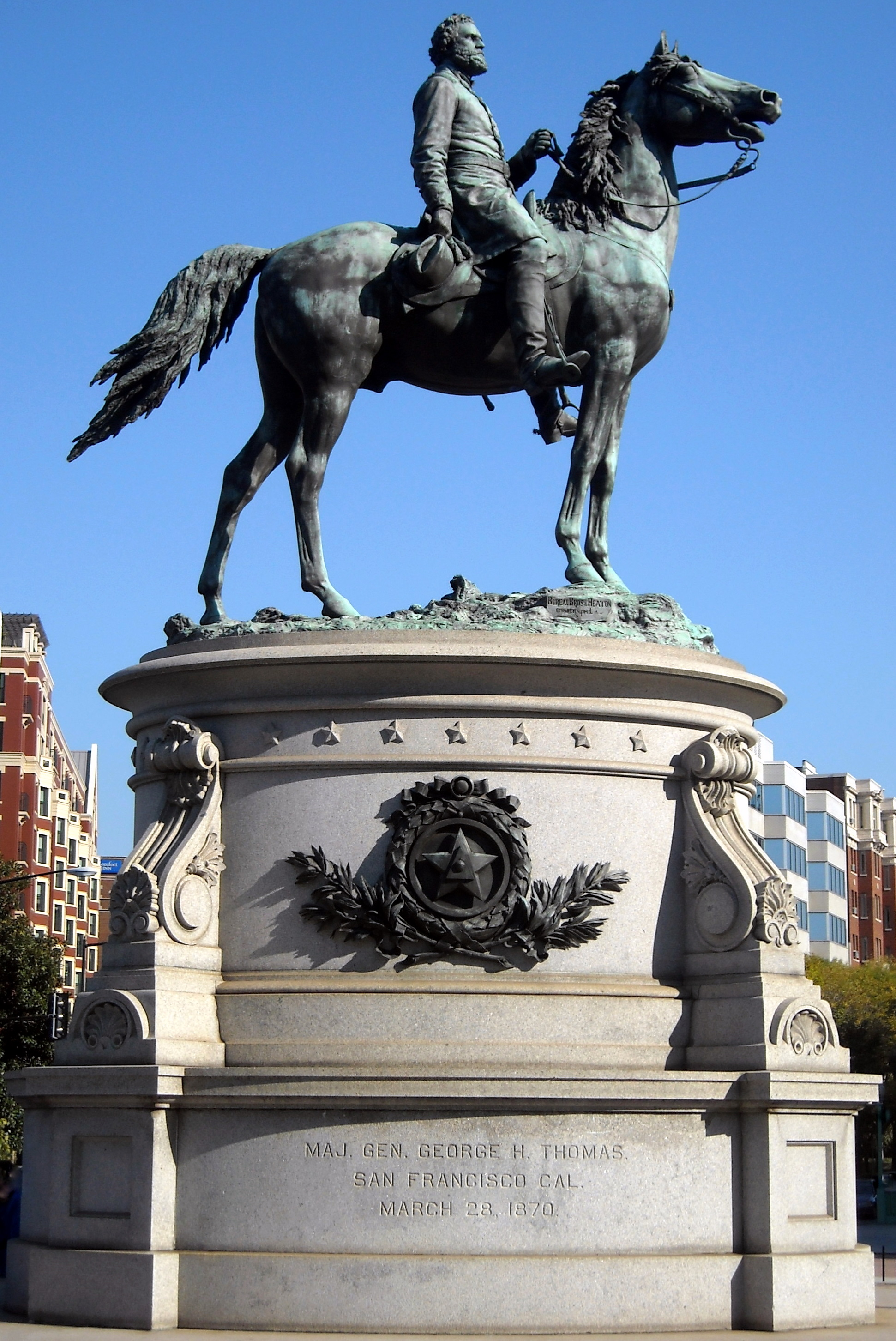
The bronze statue of Union Army general George Henry Thomas in Thomas Circle is considered one of the finest equestrian monuments in Washington, D.C.

There are many outdoor sculptures in Washington, D.C. In addition to the capital's most famous monuments and memorials, many figures recognized as national heroes (either in government or military) have been posthumously awarded with their own statue in a park or public square. Some figures appear on several statues: Abraham Lincoln, for example, has at least three likenesses, including those at the Lincoln Memorial, in Lincoln Park, and the old Superior Court of the District of Columbia. A number of international figures, such as Mohandas Gandhi, have also been immortalized with statues. The Statue of Freedom is a 19½-foot (5.9 m) tall allegorical statue that rests atop the United States Capitol dome.

In addition to the human likenesses, a number of public and private sculptures of animals, objects, and abstractions are spread throughout the city. Two museums on the National Mall include sculpture gardens: the Hirshhorn Museum and Sculpture Garden and the National Gallery of Art.

== Statues of historical figures ==
- Archer Alexander at Lincoln Park
- Dante Alighieri in Meridian Hill Park
- José Artigas at 18th Street and Constitution Avenue NW
- Francis Asbury at 16th and Mount Pleasant Streets NW
- Mustafa Kemal Atatürk at the Turkish Embassy, 2525 Massachusetts Avenue NW
- Marion Barry in front of the John A. Wilson Building, 1350 Pennsylvania Avenue NW
- John Barry at Franklin Square
- Saint Bernadette at the Franciscan Monastery at 14th and Quincy Streets NE
- Mary McLeod Bethune Memorial at Lincoln Park
- Sir William Blackstone at Third Street and Constitution Avenue NW
- Equestrian of Simón Bolívar at 18th and C Streets and Virginia Avenue NW
- Simon Bolivar, Libertador at the Organization of American States, 17th Street and Constitution Avenue NW
- Chuck Brown Memorial at Langdon Park, 2900 block of 23rd Street NE
- James Buchanan at Meridian Hill Park
- Edmund Burke at 11th Street and Massachusetts Avenue NW
- John Carroll at 38th and Q Streets NW
- Saint Christopher at the Franciscan Monastery at 14th and Quincy Streets NE
- Winston Churchill at the British Embassy, 3100 Massachusetts Avenue NW
- Christopher Columbus at Holy Rosary Church, 595 Third Street NW
- Columbus Statue at Columbus Circle
- Sor Juana Inés de la Cruz at the Organization of American States, 17th Street and Constitution Avenue NW
- Louis Daguerre at Seventh and F Streets NW
- Jane Delano at 18th and E Streets NW
- William O. Douglas at 30th and Canal Streets NW
- Albert Einstein at the Albert Einstein Memorial, 21st Street and Constitution Avenue NW
- Duke Ellington at T Street and Florida Avenue NW
- Robert Emmet at 24th Street and Massachusetts Avenue NW
- John Ericsson at Ohio Drive and Independence Avenue SW
- David G. Farragut at Farragut Square NW
- Saint Francis of Assisi at the Franciscan Monastery at 14th and Quincy Streets NE
- Benjamin Franklin at 11th Street and Pennsylvania Avenue NW
- Albert Gallatin at the U.S. Treasury Building's North Portico
- Edward Miner Gallaudet at Gallaudet University
- Thomas Hopkins Gallaudet at Gallaudet University
- Bernardo de Gálvez at 22nd Street and Virginia Avenue NW
- Mahatma Gandhi Memorial at 21st and Q Streets and Massachusetts Avenue NW
- James A. Garfield at Garfield Circle
- Cardinal James Gibbons at 16th Street and Park Road NW
- Gibran Khalil Gibran on Massachusetts Ave NW
- Josh Gibson at Nationals Park
- Samuel Gompers at 10th Street and Massachusetts Avenue NW
- Ulysses S. Grant on the National Mall
- Nathanael Greene in Stanton Park NE
- Théodore Guérin on the grounds of the Basilica of the National Shrine of the Immaculate Conception
- Samuel Hahnemann at 16th Street and Massachusetts Avenue NW
- Nathan Hale at Ninth Street and Constitution Avenue NW
- Alexander Hamilton at the U.S. Treasury Building's South Portico
- Winfield Scott Hancock at Seventh Street and Pennsylvania Avenue NW
- Joseph Henry at 10th Street and Jefferson Drive NW
- Frank Howard at Nationals Park
- Cordell Hull at the Organization of American States, 17th Street and Constitution Avenue NW
- Queen Isabella of Spain at the Organization of American States, 17th Street and Constitution Avenue NW
- Andrew Jackson at Lafayette Square NW
- Philip Jaisohn at the Korean Consulate on Sheridan Circle
- Thomas Jefferson at the Jefferson Memorial
- Saint Jerome at the Croatian Embassy, 24th Street and Massachusetts Avenue NW
- Joan of Arc in Meridian Hill Park
- Pope John Paul II at the Pope John Paul II Cultural Center, 3900 Harewood Road NE
- Walter Johnson at Nationals Park
- John Paul Jones at the John Paul Jones Memorial at 17th Street and Independence Avenue SW
- Benito Juárez at Virginia and New Hampshire Avenues NW
- Francis Scott Key at 36th and M Street NW
- Martin Luther King Jr. at the Martin Luther King Jr. Memorial in West Potomac Park, adjacent to the National Mall
- Tadeusz Kościuszko at Lafayette Square NW
- Michael Kováts de Fabricy at the Hungarian Embassy, 3910 Shoemaker Street NW
- Marquis Gilbert de Lafayette at Lafayette Square NW
- Abraham Lincoln at the Lincoln Memorial
- Abraham Lincoln at Lincoln Park
- Abraham Lincoln at Fourth and D Streets NW
- Abraham Lincoln at President Lincoln's Cottage at the Soldiers' Home at Upshur Street and Rock Creek Church Road NW
- Major General John A. Logan at Logan Circle NW
- Henry Wadsworth Longfellow at M Street and Connecticut Avenue NW
- Martin Luther at 14th Street and Massachusetts Avenue NW
- Nelson Mandela at the Embassy of South Africa
- Guglielmo Marconi at 16th and Lamont Streets NW
- John Marshall at Fourth Street and Constitution Avenue NW
- Crown Princess Märtha, Norwegian Embassy
- Mary, Protector of Faith on the grounds of the Basilica of the National Shrine of the Immaculate Conception
- Tomáš Garrigue Masaryk at 22nd Street and Massachusetts Avenue NW
- George Mason at the George Mason Memorial in East Potomac Park
- George B. McClellan at Connecticut Avenue and Columbia Road NW
- James B. McPherson at McPherson Square NW
- George Meade at 3rd Street and Pennsylvania Avenue NW
- Saint Michael at the Franciscan Monastery at 14th and Quincy Streets NE
- Peter Muhlenberg at Muhlenberg Park, Connecticut Avenue and Ellicott Street NW
- Pablo Neruda at the Organization of American States, 17th Street and Constitution Avenue NW
- Teresa de la Parra at the Organization of American States, 17th Street and Constitution Avenue NW
- John Pershing at 14th Street and Pennsylvania Avenue NW
- Albert Pike at Third and D Streets NW
- Count Casimir Pulaski at 13th Street and Pennsylvania Avenue NW
- Alexander Pushkin at 22nd and H Streets NW
- John A. Rawlins at 18th and E Streets NW
- Comte Jean de Rochambeau at Lafayette Square NW
- Eleanor Roosevelt in Room 4 of the Franklin Delano Roosevelt Memorial
- Eleanor Roosevelt at the Washington National Cathedral, Massachusetts and Wisconsin Avenues NW
- Franklin D. Roosevelt in Room 1 of the Franklin Delano Roosevelt Memorial
- Franklin D. Roosevelt in Room 3 of the Franklin Delano Roosevelt Memorial
- Theodore Roosevelt on Theodore Roosevelt Island
- Father Godfrey Schilling at the Franciscan Monastery at 14th and Quincy Streets NE
- Winfield Scott at Scott Circle NW
- Olive Risley Seward at Sixth Street and North Carolina Avenue NE
- Alexander Robey Shepherd at 1350 Pennsylvania Avenue NW
- Philip Sheridan at Sheridan Circle NW
- William Tecumseh Sherman at 15th and E Streets NW
- Taras Shevchenko at 22nd and P Streets NW
- Friedrich Wilhelm von Steuben at Lafayette Square NW
- Robert A. Taft at the Robert A. Taft Memorial, 1st Street and Constitution Avenue NW
- George Henry Thomas at Thomas Circle NW
- José Cecilio del Valle at the Organization of American States, 17th Street and Constitution Avenue NW
- Artemas Ward at Ward Circle NW
- George Washington at Washington Circle NW
- George Washington at 20th and H Street NW
- George Washington at the Washington National Cathedral, Cathedral Drive and Wisconsin Avenue NW
- Daniel Webster Memorial at 16th Street and Massachusetts Avenue NW
- John Wesley at Wesley Theological Seminary, 4500 Massachusetts NW
- John Witherspoon at N Street and Connecticut Avenue NW
- Carter G. Woodson at 9th Street and Rhode Island Avenue NW

== Other outdoor sculpture in D.C. ==
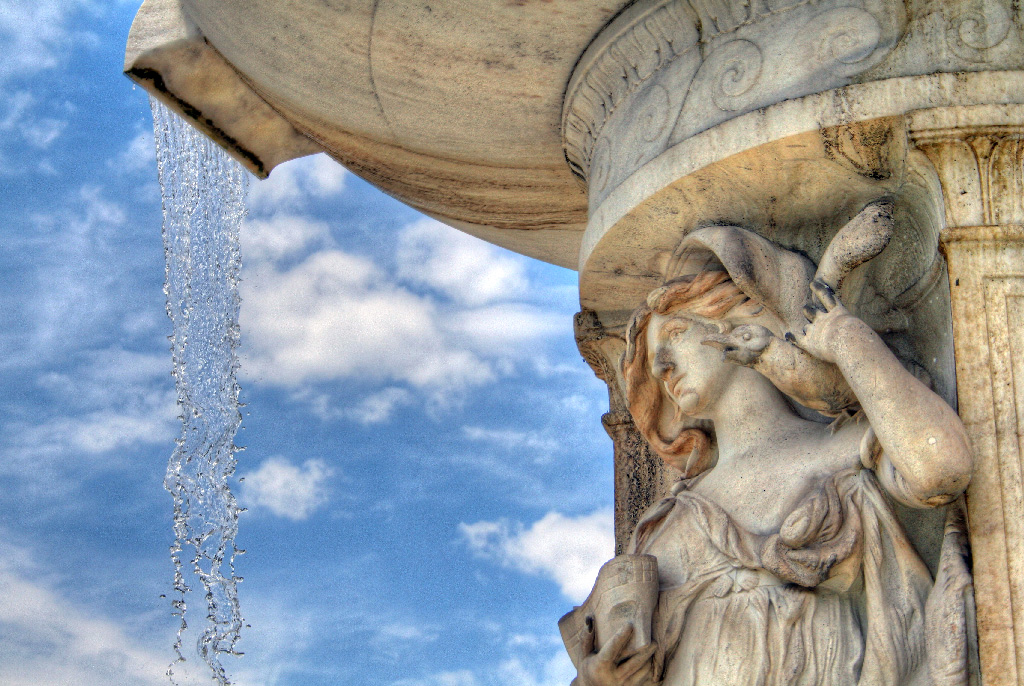
Fountain in Dupont Circle

- Boy Scout Memorial on the Ellipse
- The Burghers of Calais by Auguste Rodin at The Hirshhorn Sculpture Garden
- Civil War Nurses (aka Nuns of the Battlefield) at M Street and Rhode Island Avenue NW
- Crouching Woman by Rodin at The Hirshhorn Sculpture Garden
- Dupont Circle Fountain at Dupont Circle NW
- First Division Monument at State Place and 17th Street NW
- The Founders of the Daughters of the American Revolution at 18th and C Streets NW
- Heritage and Guardianship by James Earle Fraser at the National Archives Building on Constitution Avenue between 7th and 9th Streets NW
- (Here I Stand) In the Spirit of Paul Robeson at Georgia and Kansas avenues NW in Petworth.
- Holodomor Memorial at Massachusetts Avenue and North Capitol Streets NW
- Man Controlling Trade by Michael Lantz at Federal Trade Commission headquarters at Pennsylvania Avenue and 6th Streets NW
- Andrew W. Mellon Memorial Fountain at Constitution Ave & Pennsylvania Ave.
- The Court of Neptune Fountain by Roland Hinton Perry in front of the Library of Congress's Thomas Jefferson Building on 1st Street SE
- Peace Monument in Peace Circle on the Capitol Grounds, at Pennsylvania Avenue and 1st Street NW
- Red Cross Men and Women Killed in Service Memorial in garden of Red Cross National Headquarters, 1730 E Street NW
- Second Division Memorial at 17th Street and Constitution Avenue NW
- She Who Must Be Obeyed by Tony Smith at the Frances Perkins Building
- The Spirit of Haida Gwaii by Bill Reid at the Canadian Embassy
- Three Soldiers by Frederick Hart at the Vietnam Veterans Memorial in Constitution Gardens on Constitution Avenue NW
- Transformers by an unknown artist stands in front of a house on Prospect Street NW in Georgetown
- Women's Titanic Memorial, 5th & P Street SW
- Freedom to Read, by Davide Prete, 5001 Central Ave. SE, Washington, DC 20019 (Capitol View Library)
- Soundwave Art Park, by Davide Prete & Justin Wilson, 3390 Minnesota Ave. SE, Washington, DC 20019

== See also ==
- List of public art in Washington, D.C.
- List of artworks commemorating African Americans in Washington, D.C.
- List of statues of Abraham Lincoln
- National Gallery of Art Sculpture Garden
- National Statuary Hall
- The Awakening, installed for 27 years at Hains Point in East Potomac Park, was moved in 2008 to National Harbor, Maryland
