= District of Columbia Inventory of Historic Sites =

Register of historic places in Washington, D.C.

Agency overview
- Formed: 1964; 62 years ago
- Jurisdiction: Government of the District of Columbia
- Website: planning.dc.gov/page/dc-inventory-historic-sites

The District of Columbia Inventory of Historic Sites is a register of historic places in Washington, D.C. that are designated by the District of Columbia Historic Preservation Review Board (HPRB), a component of the District of Columbia Government.

== Historic Preservation Review Board ==
The District of Columbia Historic Preservation Review Board (HPRB) designates historic structures and districts and advises the mayor of the District of Columbia on historic preservation matters. Members of the HPRB are appointed by the mayor and are approved by the Council of the District of Columbia.

The D.C. Inventory of Historic Sites was created in 1964, and was originally compiled by the predecessor to the HPRB, the Joint Committee on Landmarks of the National Capital. As of 2019, the Inventory includes approximately 750 historic sites and 50 historic districts.

== Criteria ==
The criteria for designation are defined by the D.C. Municipal Regulations at DCMR 10-C, Section C-201. Designated properties must:

1. Possess significance
  Properties are eligible for designation as historic landmarks or historic districts if they possess one or more of the following values or qualities:
  (a) Events: They are the site of events that contributed significantly to the heritage, culture or development of the District of Columbia or the nation;
  (b) History: They are associated with historical periods, social movements, groups, institutions, achievements, or patterns of growth and change that contributed significantly to the heritage, culture or development of the District of Columbia or the nation;
  (c) Individuals: They are associated with the lives of persons significant to the history of the District of Columbia or the nation;
  (d) Architecture and Urbanism: They embody the distinguishing characteristics of architectural styles, building types, or methods of construction, or are expressions of landscape architecture, engineering, or urban planning, siting, or design significant to the appearance and development of the District of Columbia or the nation;
  (e) Artistry: They possess high artistic or aesthetic values that contribute significantly to the heritage and appearance of the District of Columbia or the nation;
  (f) Work of a Master: They have been identified as notable works of craftsmen, artists, sculptors, architects, landscape architects, urban planners, engineers, builders, or developers whose works have influenced the evolution of their fields of endeavor, or are significant to the development of the District of Columbia or the nation; or
  (g) Archaeology: They have yielded or may be likely to yield information significant to an understanding of historic or prehistoric events, cultures, and standards of living, building, and design.
2. Retain integrity
  Properties shall possess sufficient integrity to convey, represent or contain the values and qualities for which they are judged significant.
3. Be judged from a historical perspective
  Sufficient time shall have passed to permit professional evaluation and understanding of the properties in the context of history.

== See also ==
- National Register of Historic Places listings in Washington, D.C.
- List of National Historic Landmarks in Washington, D.C.
- History of Washington, D.C.
