= College Hall (University of Pennsylvania) =

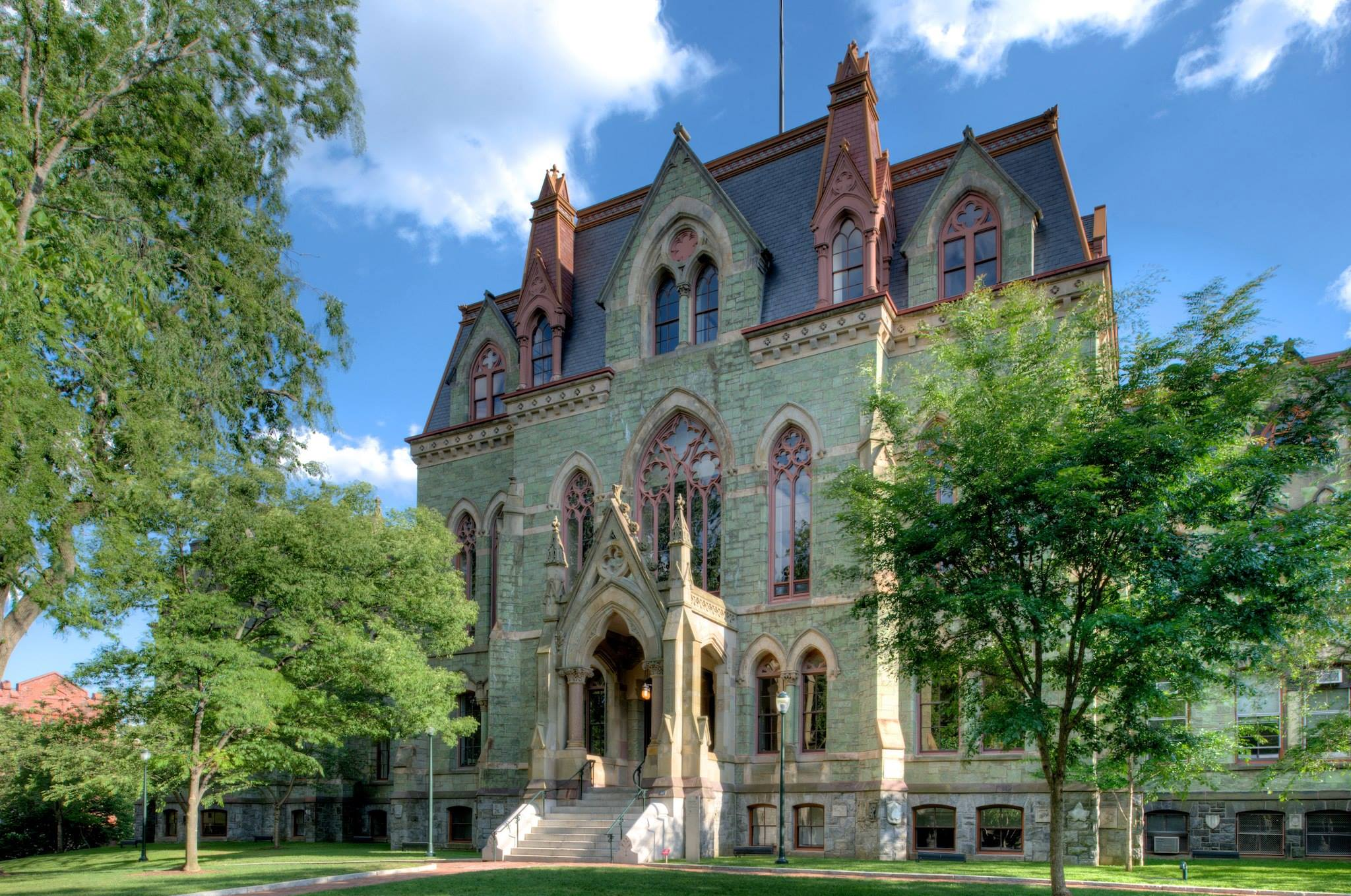
- College Hall at the University of Pennsylvania in Philadelphia in May 2015

General information
- Type: Academic, research
- Location: University City, 3450 Woodland Walk; Philadelphia, Pennsylvania, U.S.
- Opened: 1872
- Owner: University of Pennsylvania

Height
- Architectural: Victorian gothic

Technical details
- Material: Stone
- Size: 110,266 square feet (10,244.0 m^{2})
- Floor count: 6
- Lifts/elevators: 1
- Grounds: 0.5 acres (0.20 ha)

Design and construction
- Architect: Thomas W. Richards
- College Hall, University of Pennsylvania
- U.S. National Register of Historic Places
- U.S. Historic district – Contributing property
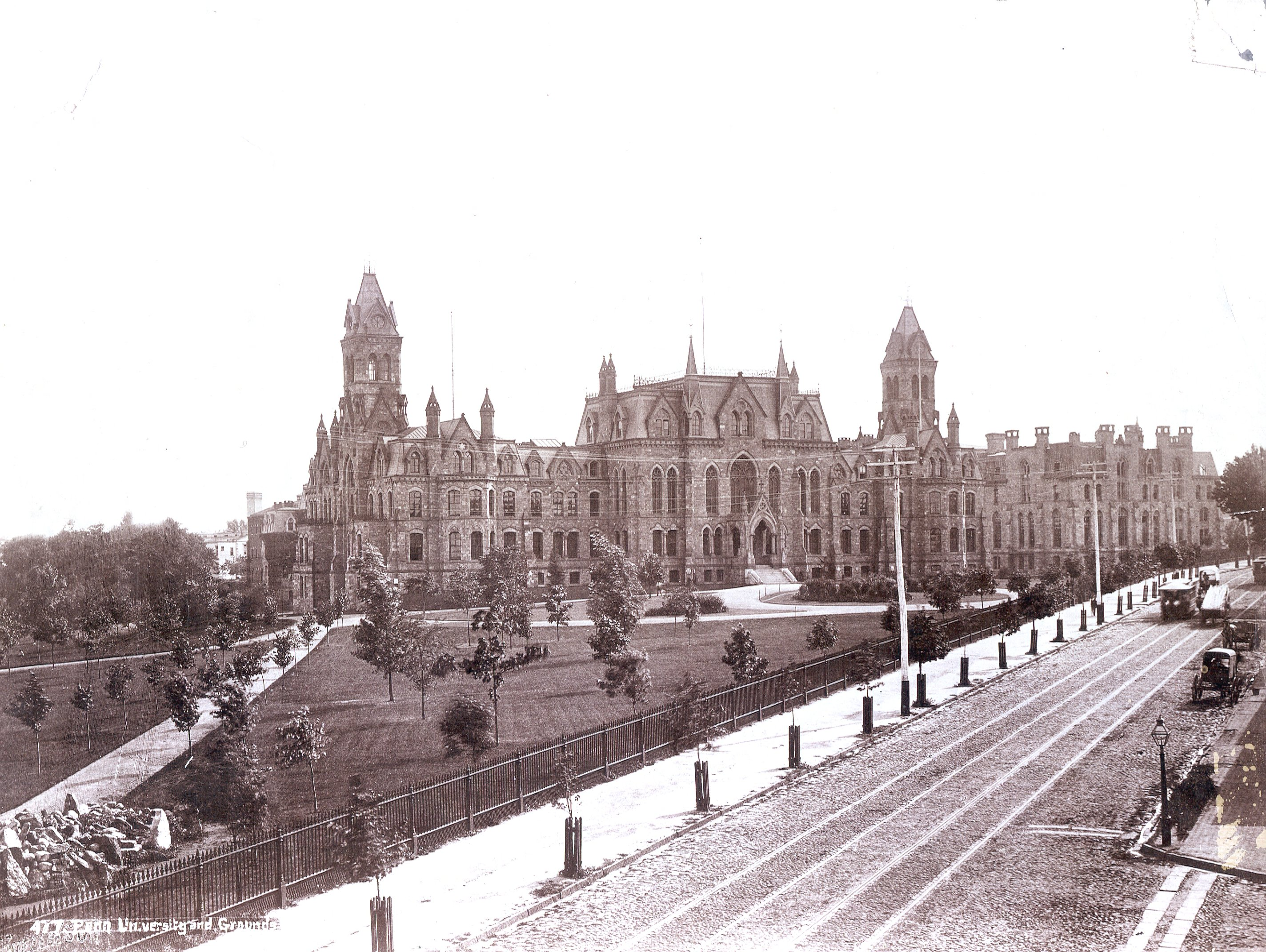
- College Hall in 1892

- Location within Philadelphia Location within Pennsylvania Location within the United States
- Location: Bounded by Walnut, Spruce, 34th, and 36th Sts., Philadelphia, Pennsylvania, U.S.
- Coordinates: 39°57′4.6″N 75°11′37.5″W
- Area: 0.5 acres (0.20 ha)
- Built: 1872
- Architect: Thomas W. Richards
- Architectural style: Victorian Gothic
- NRHP reference No.: 78002444
- Added to NRHP: February 14, 1978

College Hall is the oldest building on the West Philadelphia campus of the University of Pennsylvania. Prior to its construction, the university was located on Ninth Street in Center City, Philadelphia. The building was designed by Thomas Webb Richards and completed in 1873. The characteristic green color of the building is due to its composition of green serpentine stone.

College Hall was placed on the National Register of Historic Places February 14, 1978. It is also a contributing property of the University of Pennsylvania Campus Historic District.

The building currently houses the undergraduate admissions office, the university president's offices, the Department of History, and classrooms. The top floor of College Hall was purpose built for the Zelosophic and Philomathean Societies, and is presently home to the Philomathean Society, a literary society founded in 1813.

Although College Hall and the now-demolished Blanchard Hall were rumored to be the model for the Victorian Gothic mansion in The Addams Family cartoons, the cartoonist Charles Addams repeatedly denied the claims.

Renovation of College Hall's west wing commenced in 2023, and was complete as of early 2025.

== Gallery ==
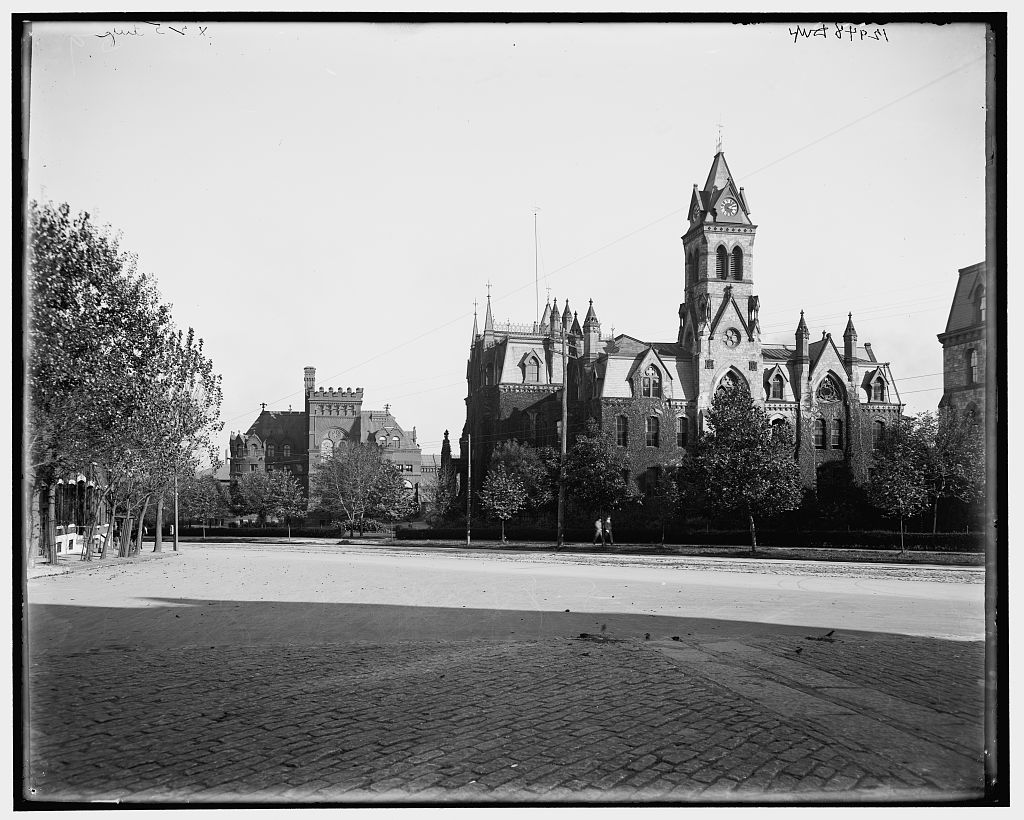
College Hall and the University of Pennsylvania library from Locust Street, c. 1901

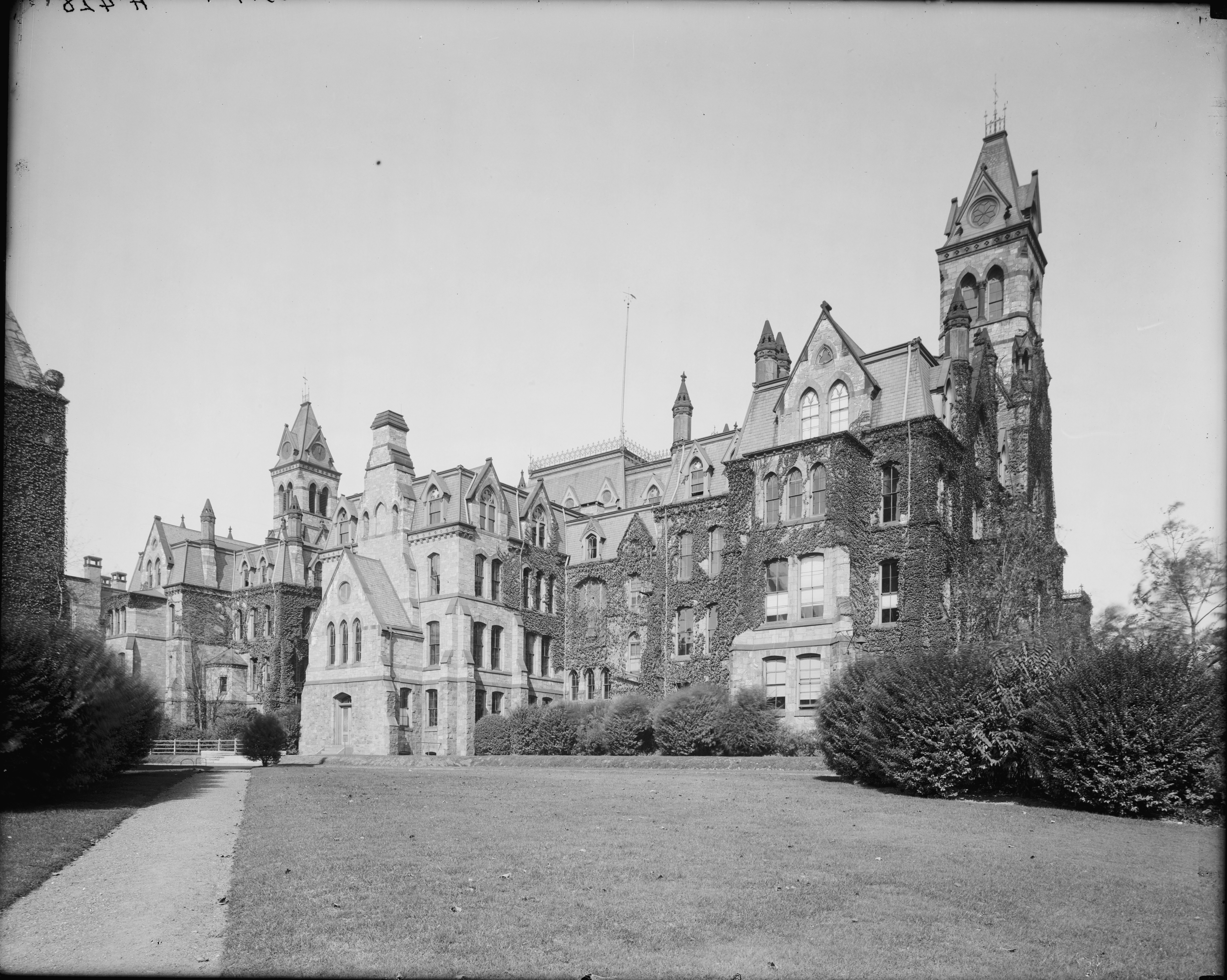
College Hall from the southeast, before 1910

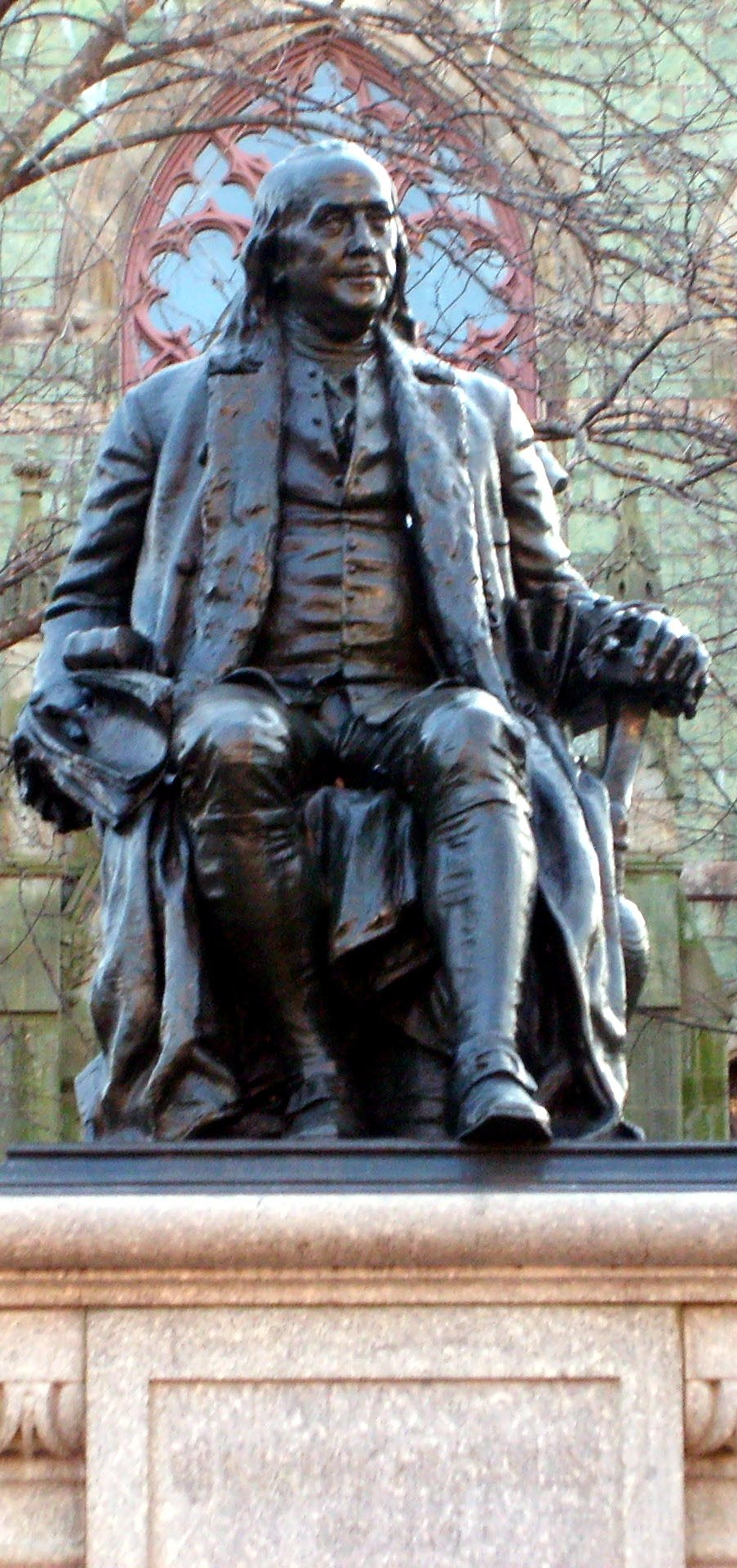
John J. Boyle's 1899 statue of Benjamin Franklin in front of College Hall
