= John Christian Bullitt =

American lawyer (1824–1902)

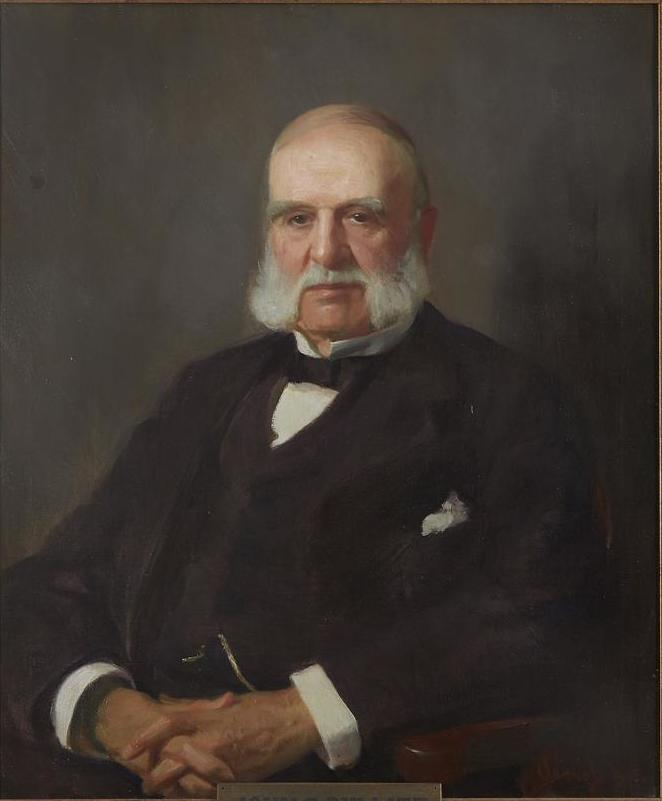
- Born: 10 February 1824; Jefferson County, Kentucky, U.S.
- Died: 25 August 1902 (aged 78); Philadelphia, Pennsylvania, U.S.
- Education: Centre College
- Occupation: Lawyer
- Known for: founding Drinker Biddle & Reath, drafting Philadelphia's city charter
- Spouse: Therese Langhorne

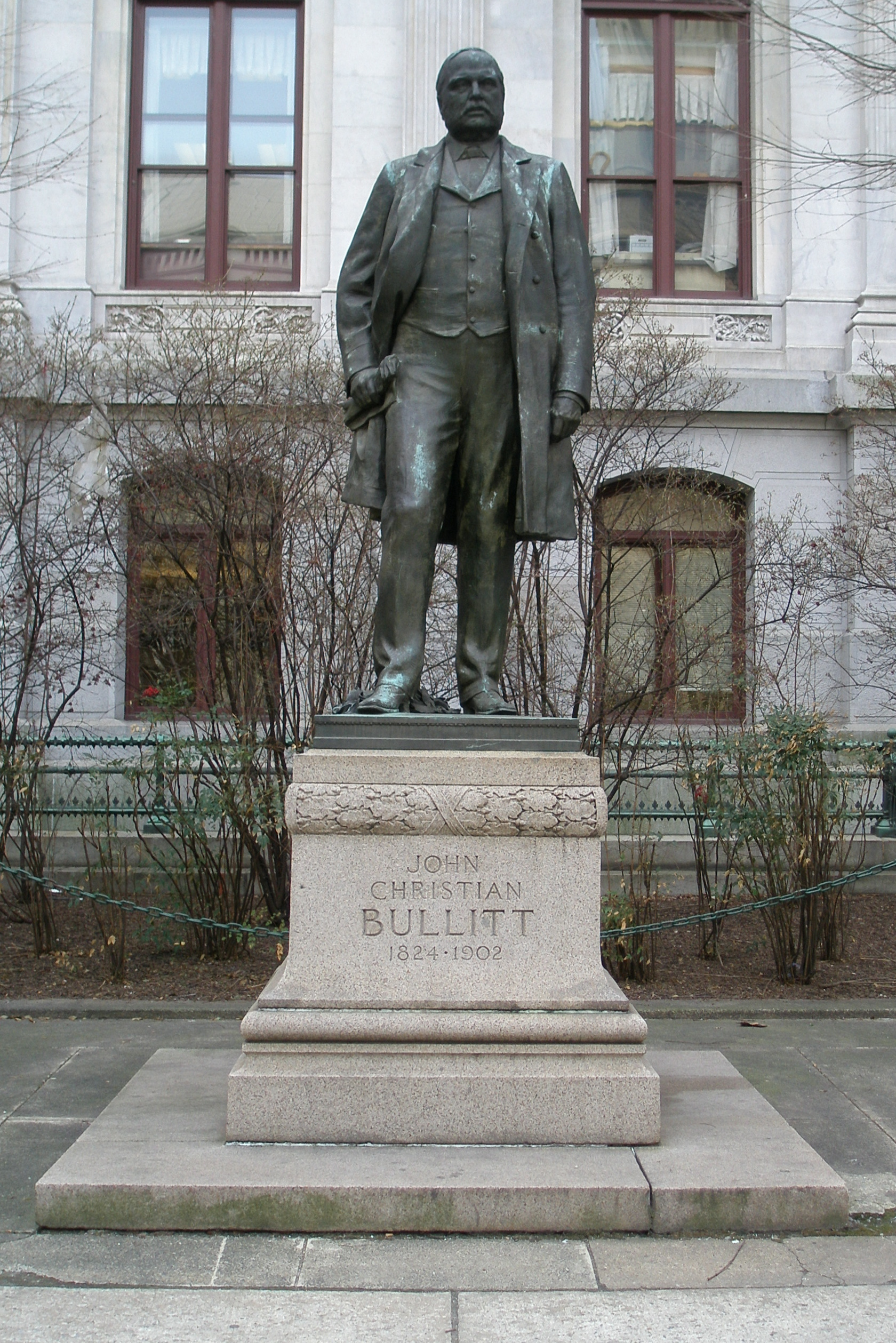
Statue of John Christian Bullitt on the North Plaza of Philadelphia City Hall

John Christian Bullitt (February 10, 1824–1902) was a lawyer and civic figure in the city of Philadelphia, Pennsylvania. He founded the law firm known today as Faegre, Drinker, Biddle & Reath. Erected in 1907, Bullitt's bronze statue adjacent to City Hall was the work of artist John J. Boyle and was dedicated to his legacy of reforming Philadelphia City government.

== Early life ==
Bullitt was born to a prominent Kentucky family in 1824. His family had a political background: his great-grandfather, Cuthbert Bullitt, was a colonial political leader in Prince William County, Virginia, his grandfather, Alexander Scott Bullitt, was President of Kentucky's first Constitutional Convention, and his father, William C. Bullitt, was a member of Kentucky's Constitutional Convention of 1850. John Christian Bullitt was the third of ten children. Among his siblings were Joshua Bullitt, Susan Peachy Bullitt (who would later marry Senator Archibald Dixon) and Thomas Walker Bullitt, father of William Marshall Bullitt.

His father, the planter William C. Bullitt, owned over 100 slaves. Several of John's brothers fought for the Confederacy in the American Civil War.

== Legal career ==
Bullitt graduated from Centre College and moved to Philadelphia in 1849, on the advice of Secretary of State and future President James Buchanan, whom he had met on a tour in Washington, D.C. Bullitt wed Therese Langhorne in 1850. It was in Philadelphia that Bullitt began his legal practice. One of his earliest clients was the Bank of Kentucky. Bullitt and his law partner, Samuel Dickson, soon created one of the most successful and lucrative law offices in the city. The partners reportedly earned over $100,000 per year. Bullitt would later represent financier Jay Cooke in the aftermath of the Panic of 1873.

Bullitt served as a delegate to the Pennsylvania Constitutional Convention of 1873, and in 1885 drafted the "Bullitt Bill", which would become the Philadelphia City Charter two years later. Among other benefits to Philadelphia, this strengthened the role of the Mayor to combat corruption. He also founded the Fourth Street National Bank in 1886.

He would continue his legal practice until his death in 1902. He is buried at Laurel Hill Cemetery. His grandson, William Christian Bullitt, Jr., would become the United States Ambassador to the Soviet Union.
