= Statue of John Barry =

Memorial in Washington, D.C., U.S.

- Commodore John Barry
- U.S. Historic district – Contributing property
- D.C. Inventory of Historic Sites
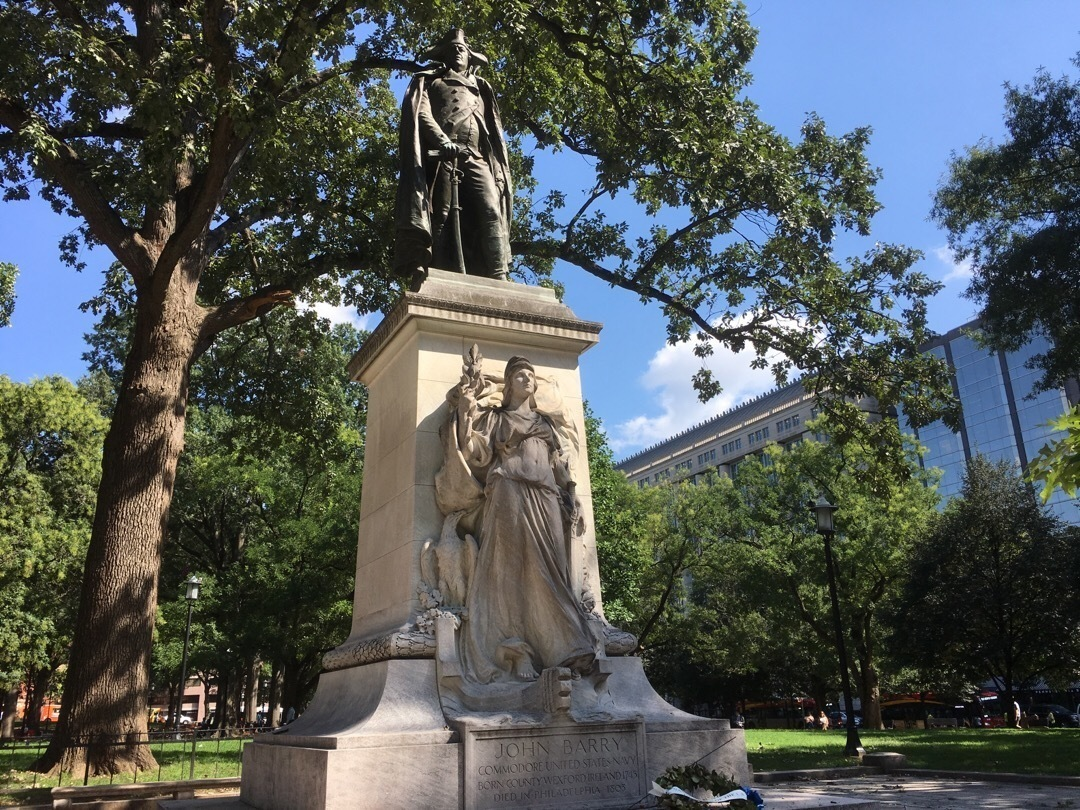
- Commodore John Barry statue in 2015
- Location: Franklin Square, Washington, D.C.
- Coordinates: 38°54′7″N 77°1′54″W
- Built: 1914
- Architect: John Boyle (sculptor); Edward Pearce Casey (architect); Roman Bronze Works (founder)
- Part of: American Revolution Statuary (78000256); L'Enfant Plan (97000332)

Significant dates
- Designated CP: July 14, 1978 (American Revolution Statuary); April 24, 1997 (L'Enfant Plan)
- Designated DCIHS: March 3, 1979

The statue of John Barry commemorates the "Father of the United States Navy", Commodore John Barry (1745–1806). Barry was an Irish-born sailor who joined the American colonists in the fight for independence from the Kingdom of Great Britain. Barry became the first officer to be commissioned by the Second Continental Congress. He captained several ships during the American Revolutionary War, and fought not only in the Continental Navy, but also in the Continental Army as well. He was the first American to capture an enemy ship and was promoted to commodore by President George Washington in 1794. Barry's last ship, the United States, fought in the Quasi-War. He retired in 1801, but remained head of the United States Navy until his death in 1806.

Plans to build a memorial to Barry began in 1902. With assistance from members of Congress, a bill to install the memorial and the allocation of $50,000 (equivalent to $1,745,741 in 2024) to pay for it was approved in 1906. The National Commodore John Barry Statue Commission included government officials, veterans, and many Irish American groups. The person who won the commission to create the sculpture was John J. Boyle. Work on the sculpture and pedestal took place from 1911 to 1913.

A dedication ceremony for the memorial took place in 1914, and included a large parade through Washington, D.C. Over 10,000 people, including President Woodrow Wilson, members of Congress, military leaders, and Supreme Court justices, attended the ceremony. The unveiling of the statue was done by one of Barry's descendants. The bronze statue of Barry is located at the western edge of Franklin Square in downtown Washington, D.C. Barry is portrayed wearing a military uniform while his right hand is holding scrolls and resting on a sword. The female allegorical statue on the front of the pedestal represents Victory. She is holding a laurel wreath as an eagle rests below her right arm.

The memorial is one of fourteen statues listed on the National Register of Historic Places (NRHP) and the District of Columbia Inventory of Historic Sites in 1978 and 1979, respectively. The memorial is also a contributing property to the L'Enfant Plan, listed on the NRHP in 1997.

== History ==
=== Barry's biography ===
John Barry was born 1745 in Ireland, and later worked as a cabin boy before immigrating to the British colonies in America at age 15. Fifteen years later, as the Thirteen Colonies began fighting for their independence in the American Revolutionary War, he joined the Continental Navy. Barry was named captain of USS Lexington in December 1775, the first commission by the Second Continental Congress. While commanding the ship, he became the first American to capture a Royal Navy ship.

Barry commanded Lexington for most of 1776. Not only did Barry serve in the Continental Navy, he also served in the Continental Army during the winter of 1776–1777, successfully fighting the enemy at the Battle of Trenton and Battle of Princeton. In 1777, he commanded USS Delaware, and was responsible for leading successful attacks on the Royal Navy. In 1778, he commanded the USS Raleigh, which ran aground and was repaired for use by British forces. In 1781, Barry commanded USS Alliance during a successful battle with the Royal Navy. He was seriously injured in the process, but it was the final naval battle of the war.

After the war ended and America had won its freedom, President George Washington issued Barry Commission Number 1. He was referred to as commodore from that point. His final ship was the United States which he captained during the Quasi-War with France. He retired after that war, but retained his role as head of the United States Navy until his death in 1803. Barry's contribution to American wars, including being the first American commissioned naval officer, earned him praise and admiration. He is referred to as the "Father of the United States Navy".

=== Memorial plans ===
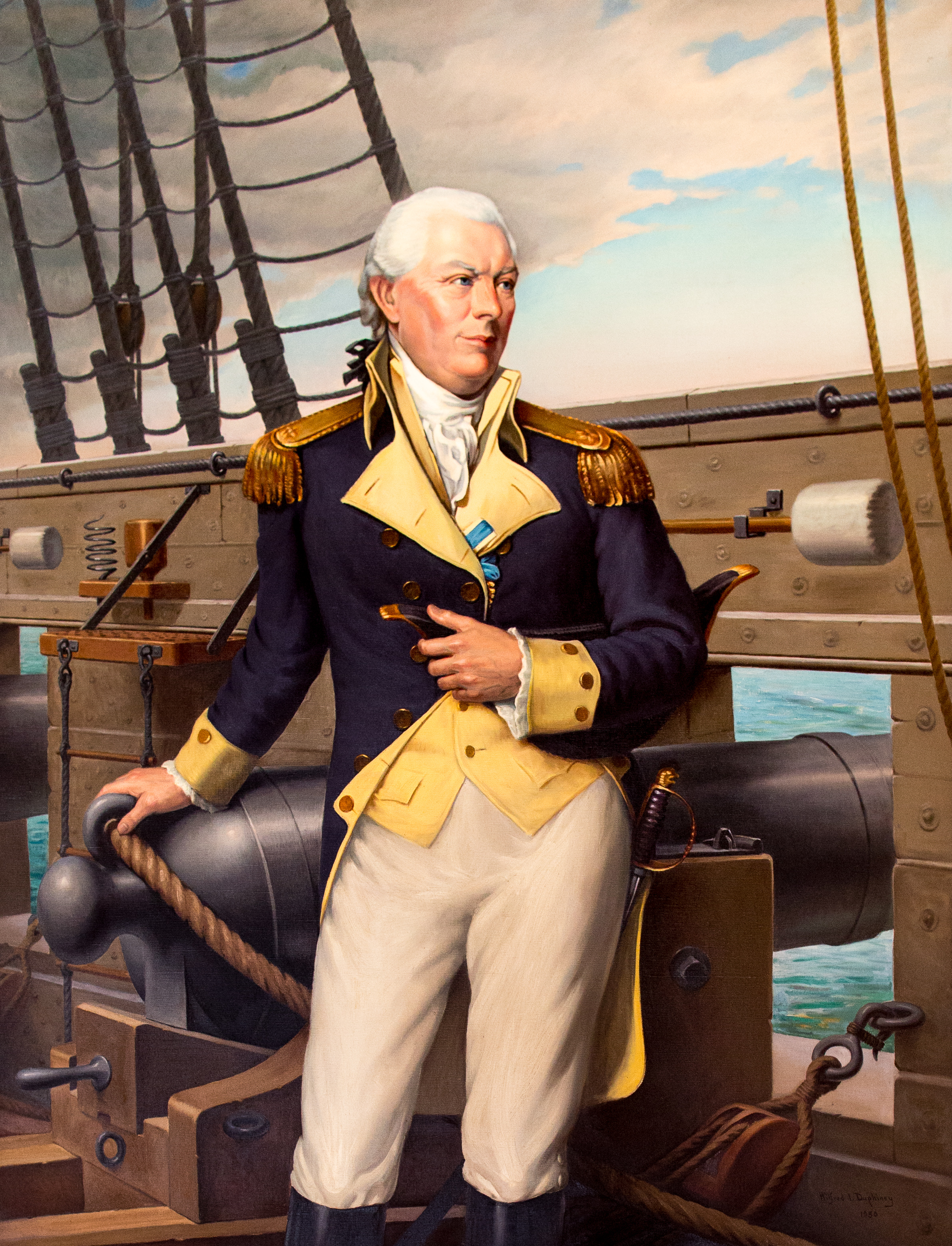
A portrait of John Barry by Wilfred Israel Duphiney

In early 1902, a social club in Washington, D.C., voted unanimously for a memorial to be placed in the city. Michael Francis O'Donoghue, husband of Marian Longfellow O'Donoghue, was an Irish American who was tasked with getting permission from Congress for the memorial. Representative Michael E. Driscoll and Senator Thomas Kearns agreed to introduce a bill in Congress that would result in the erection of the memorial. The first bill was written by O'Donoghue and was introduced in the House of Representatives and the Senate. With assistance from Senator Henry C. Hansbrough, the bill passed the Senate with an appropriation of $25,000 (equivalent to $906,442 in 2024) for the memorial to be built. Senator George P. Wetmore later increased the funding to $50,000 (equivalent to $1,812,885 in 2024).

Later that year, the National Commodore John Barry Statue Commission was formed, which included members of Congress and the public. The plan for a memorial was supported by Irish organizations including the Ancient Order of Hibernians, as well as the Daughters of the American Revolution and the Sons of the American Revolution. At the same time, there were calls for the funding of a memorial to John Paul Jones. The bill was modified to include approval of both memorials, allocating $50,000 for each one. After passing both chambers of Congress, the bill was signed into law by President Theodore Roosevelt on June 8, 1906. A competition between 25 Irish American artists took place in 1908 to find a sculptor for the memorial.

After the winning design was rejected and the other top two finalists were eliminated, the person chosen to sculpt the statue was Irish-American John Boyle, a choice hailed by Irish groups. After the design was approved in 1911, the committee in charge of the memorial chose Franklin Square as the place where the memorial would be installed. After numerous ideas were suggested for its location in the park, it was decided the memorial would stand in the center of the western edge of the park. One person who supported its location was landscape architect George Burnap from the United States Army Corps of Engineers who lamented the fact that "In America, we have the horrid habit of placing an equestrian statue to some war hero or other in the exact centre [sic] of every park."

Final approval of the memorial's design occurred in 1911 and a contract was signed with Boyle in November that year. The model was completed in 1911 and the casting in 1913. In addition to Boyle, Edward Pearce Casey was selected to be the memorial's architect, Irving W. Payne and Burnap to be the landscape architects, and Roman Bronze Works to be the founder.

A report in 1913 to the Department of War indicated the model of the statue would be completed by Spring 1914, and that casting it in bronze would take several months. There was also an appropriations bill made for the federal government to allocate $2,500 for the memorial dedication ceremony. In December 1913, the memorial's foundation, base, and a surrounding plaza were completed. Irish American groups postponed the dedication until May 1914, mostly because it would allow them to properly prepare for the ceremony.

=== Dedication ===
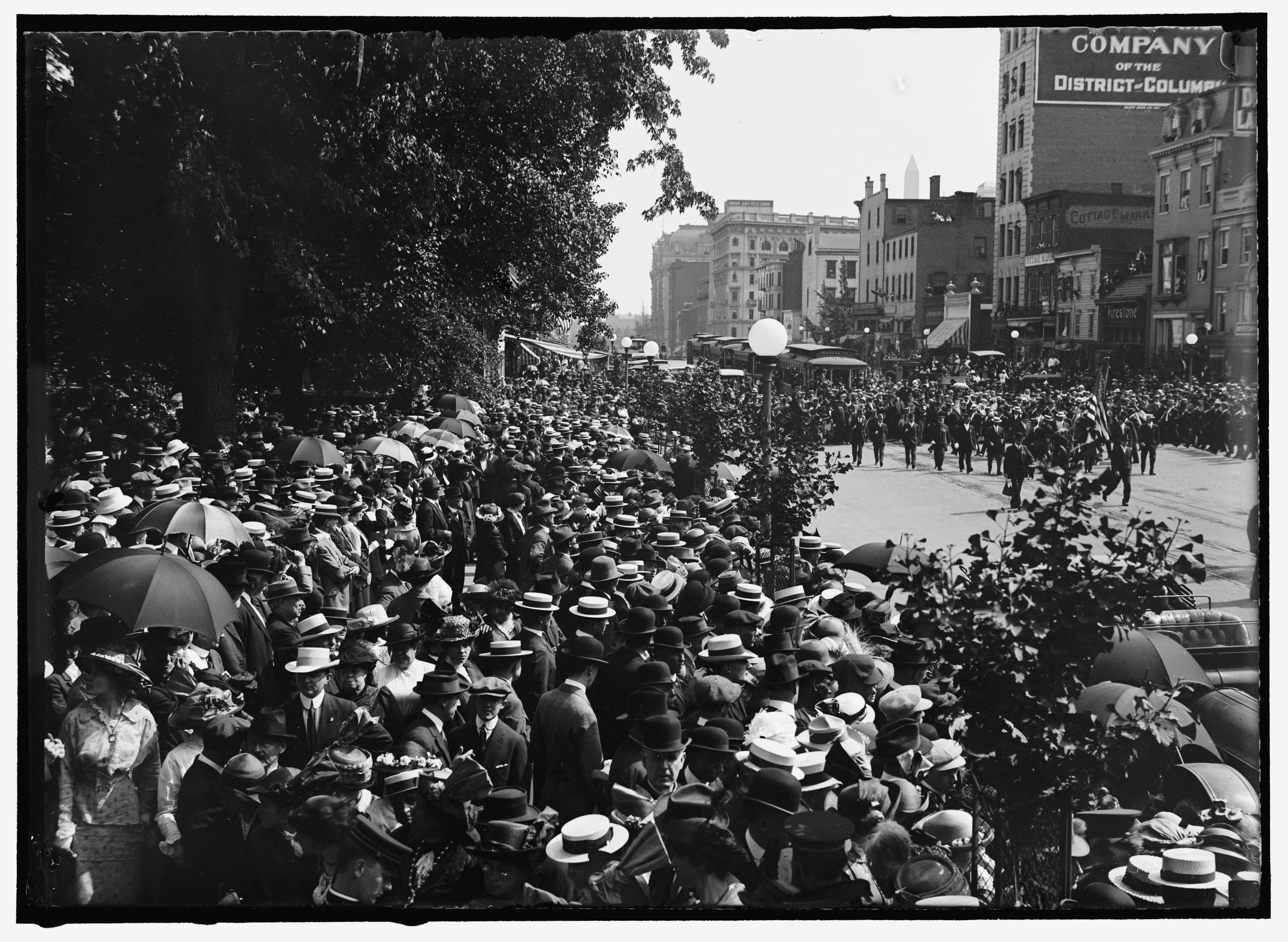
People watching the dedication ceremony parade

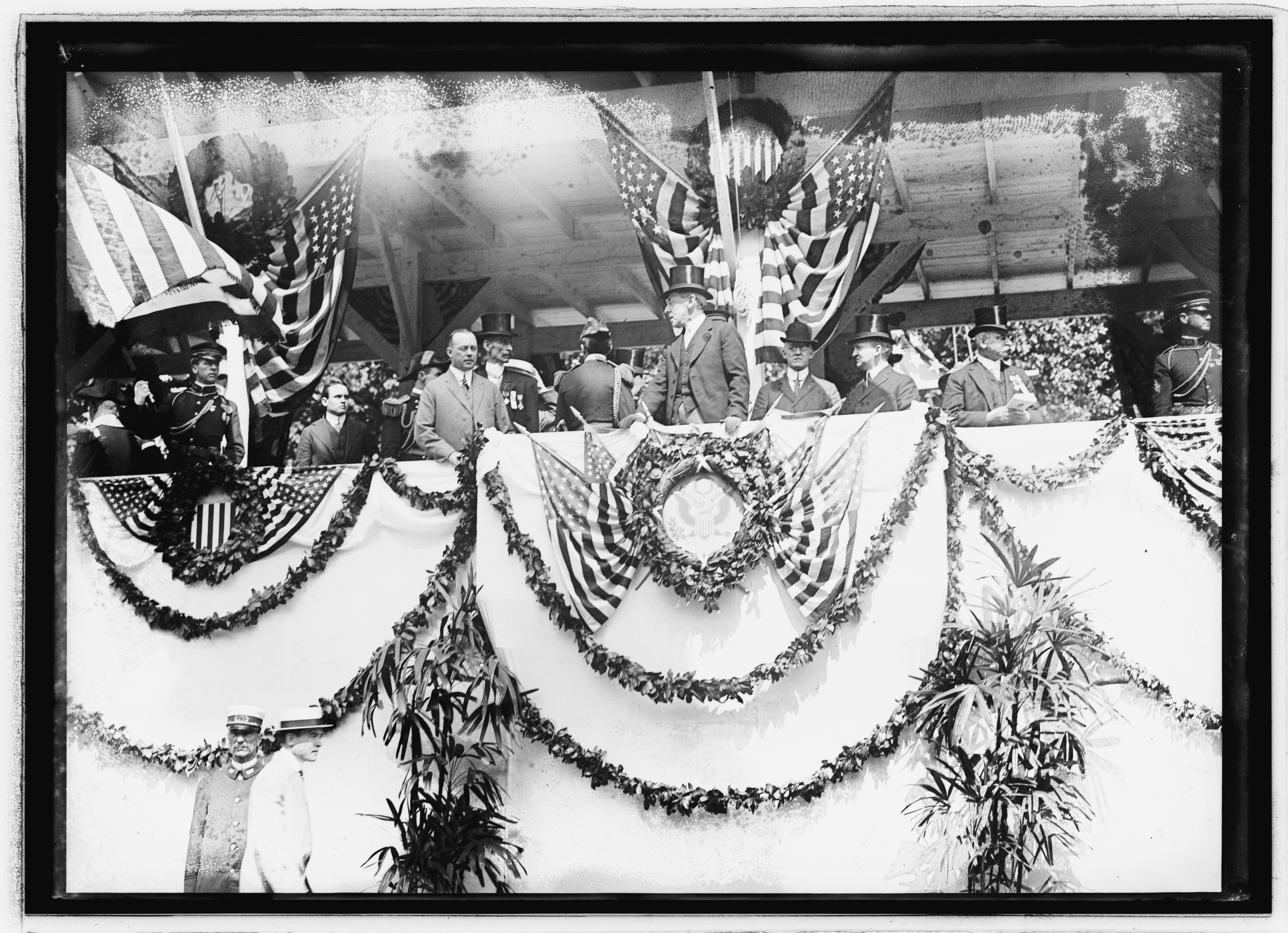
President Woodrow Wilson in the reviewing stand

The day before the dedication ceremony on May 16, 1914, thousands of members from Irish organizations including the Irish Fellowship Club, American Irish Historical Society, and Ancient Order of Hibernians, planned to travel to Mount Vernon in order to visit Washington's tomb. All Irish Americans were invited to the ceremony on the 16th, and many families with the Barry surname planned to attend. Approximately 10,000 people traveled to Washington, D.C. for the event, many coming by train.

Before the ceremony began, there was a parade leading to the memorial, and many buildings along the way were decorated with U.S. flags and green flags depicting the harp of Erin. Amongst those who marched in the parade were Irish American organization members, including the Friendly Sons of St. Patrick, and active and retired members of the military, including a contingent of veterans. The parade began at 18th Street NW and Pennsylvania Avenue, and after passing Lafayette Square, turned north on Madison Place to Vermont Avenue. The parade then walked north to I Street and traveled to 14th Street, reaching Franklin Square. After walking past the review stand, the parade ended a few blocks north at Thomas Circle.

Prominent people in attendance included President Woodrow Wilson and some of his cabinet members, and Supreme Court justices. Members of the U.S. military, including the army and navy, were also in attendance. The Senate and House of Representatives recessed at 2pm so that members could attend. Music during the ceremony was provided by the United States Marine Band.

The invocation was given by Bishop Alfred Harding. This was followed by a speech from Representative James A. Hamill who listed Barry's achievements. The Marine Band played additional music before a speech was made by Asa Bird Gardiner, secretary general of the Society of the Cincinnati, who paid tribute not only to Barry, but other military heroes of the Revolutionary War. The unveiling was done by Elise H. Hepburne, a descendant of Barry, while the Marine Band played The Star-Spangled Banner. President Wilson then gave a brief speech praising Barry. The day after the ceremony, a large banquet took place at the Willard Hotel with the President and other government officials in attendance.

=== Later history ===
For many years officials from the Department of the Navy would lay wreaths at the city's navy memorials on Navy Day, a practice that ended in 1949 when Armed Forces Day was established. On Saint Patrick's Day members of the local Irish War Veterans group would also lay wreaths at the memorial.

On July 14, 1978, a group of fourteen American Revolution Statuary, including the Barry memorial, was listed on the National Register of Historic Places (NRHP). The following year on March 3, 1979, the group was added to the District of Columbia Inventory of Historic Sites. On April 24, 1997, the memorial was included as a contributing property to the L'Enfant Plan, added to the NRHP on April 24, 1997.

== Location and design ==
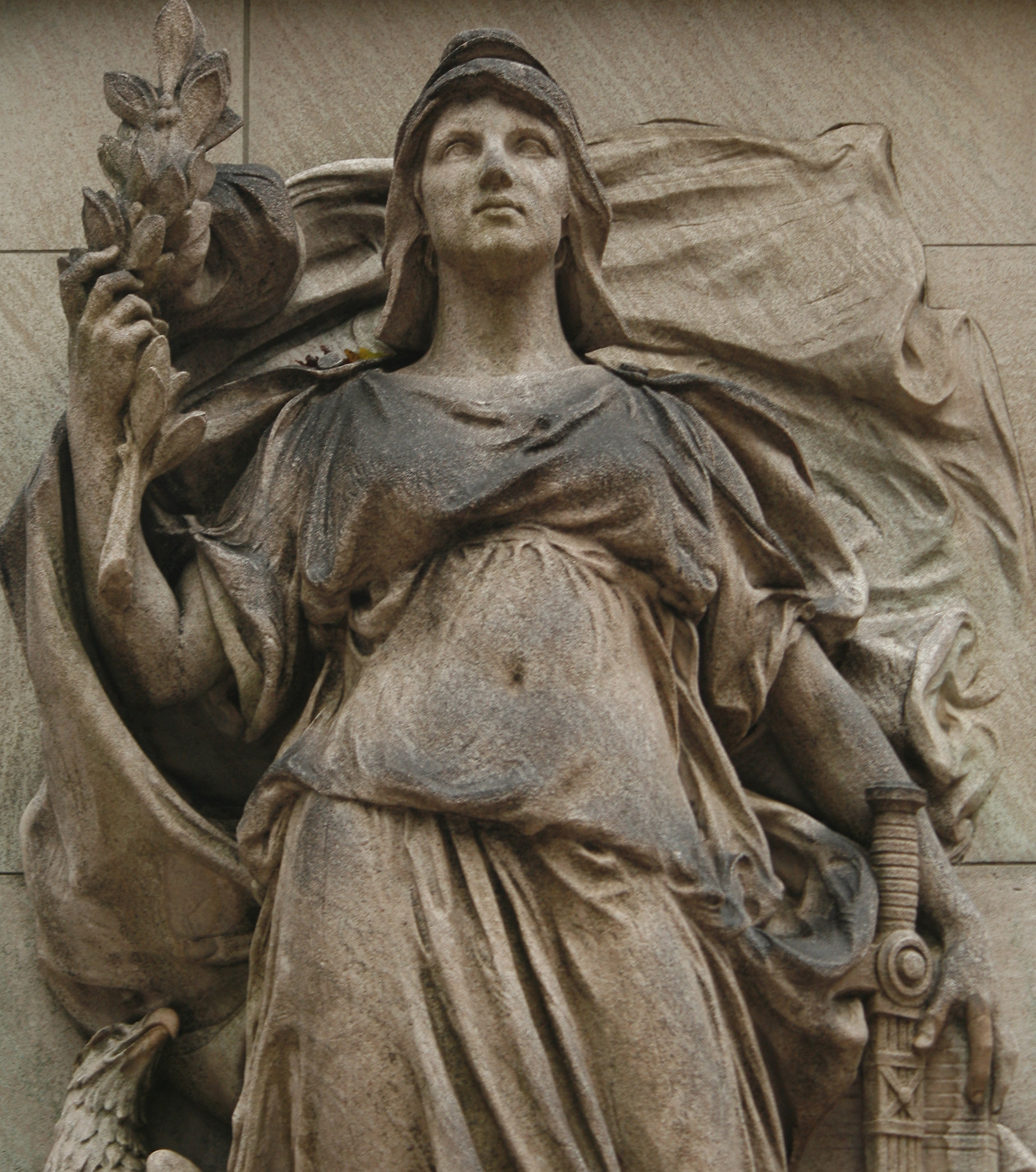
The female allegorical figure representing Victory

The memorial is located on the western edge of Franklin Square, facing 14th Street, and between I and K Streets NW. It is centered in a rectangular marble plaza, with a marble bench and small iron fence behind the memorial. Marble steps connect the plaza to the sidewalk along 14th Street. The statue of Barry is approximately 8 feet (2.4 m) tall and made of bronze. He is depicted wearing his military uniforms of the Navy and Army, including a large cloak and a three-cornered hat. His left arm is reclined by his side and his right hand is holding a stack of papers resting on a sword. His left leg stands further out than the right, giving the appearance of him walking.

The pedestal is approximately 15 feet (4.6 m) tall and 4 feet (1.2 m) wide. It is made of Knoxville pink marble while the base steps are made of pink granite. On the front of the pedestal is an allegorical female figure representing Victory which is also made of Knoxville pink marble. Her right arm is raised, holding a laurel wreath, while an eagle rests under the arm. Her left hand is resting on the top of a sword. She has long hair that rests on her shoulders. Her outfit consists of a long robe which is tied at the chest and the waist.

The inscription on the memorial reads:
(Pedestal, west face:)
J.J. BOYLE
(Base, front:)
JOHN BARRY
COMMODORE UNITED STATES NAVY
BORN COUNTY WEXFORD IRELAND 1745
DIED IN PHILADELPHIA 1803
(Base, right:)
JOHN J. BOYLE
SCULPTOR
EDWARD P. CASEY
ARCHITECT

== See also ==
- List of public art in Washington, D.C., Ward 2
- National Register of Historic Places in Washington, D.C.
- Outdoor sculpture in Washington, D.C.
