= Stone Age in America =

Sculpture by John J. Boyle

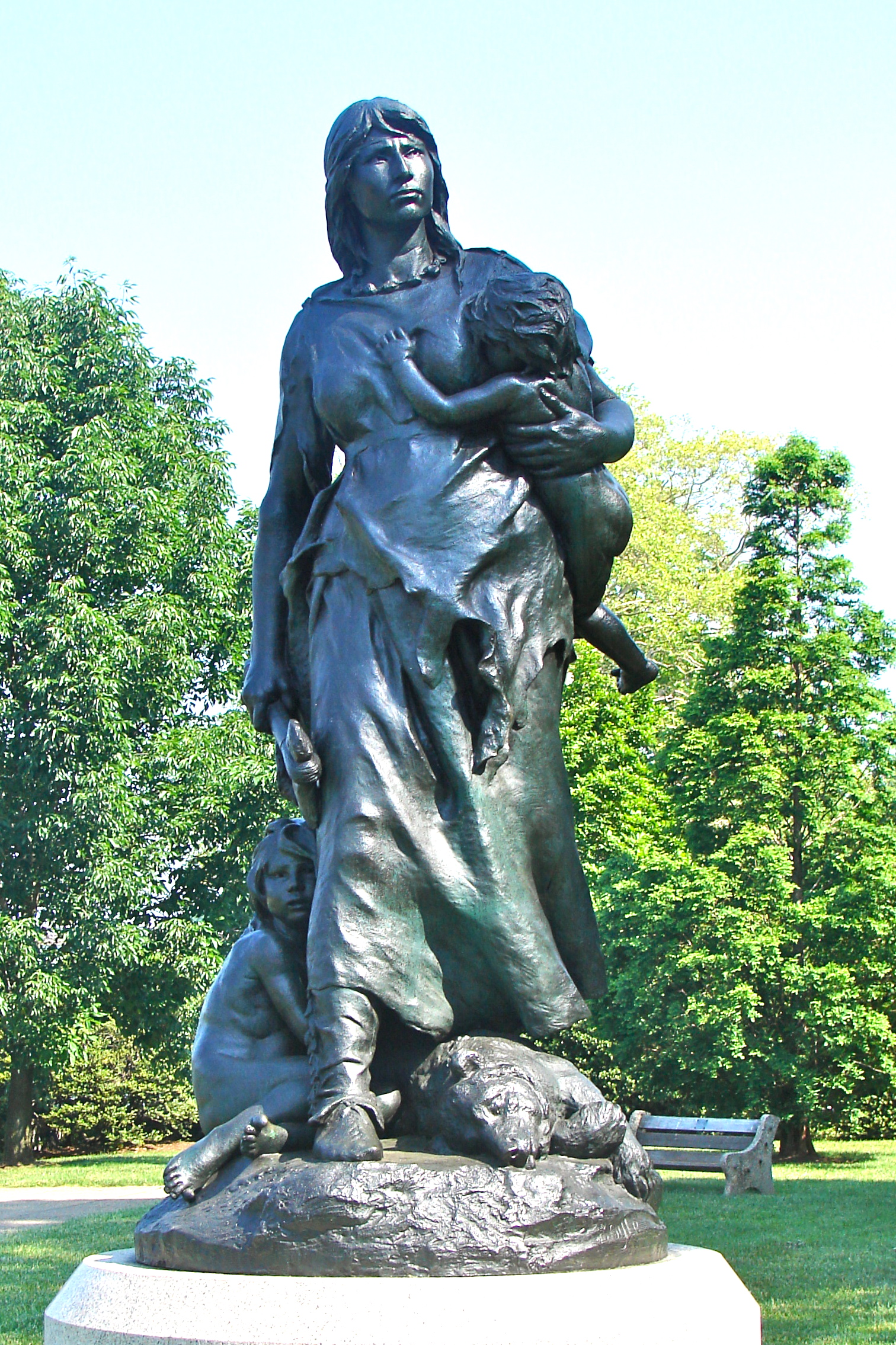
- Interactive map of Stone Age in America
- Location: Fairmount Park, Philadelphia, Pennsylvania, United States
- Coordinates: 39.971969°N 75.190219°W
- Designer: John J. Boyle
- Material: Bronze
- Length: 100 centimetres (39 in)
- Width: 100 centimetres (39 in)
- Height: 230 centimetres (91 in)
- Completion date: 1887

Stone Age in America is an 1887 bronze statue by John J. Boyle located in Philadelphia, in Fairmount Park on Kelly Drive near Boathouse Row.

It was displayed at the American Art Association, and in 1888 was exhibited in Philadelphia where it was temporarily shown at 9th and Chestnut streets. It was exhibited at the 1893 World's Columbian Exposition.

Stone Age in America is one of 51 sculptures included in the Association for Public Art's Museum Without Walls: AUDIO™ interpretive audio program for Philadelphia's outdoor sculpture.

The inscription reads:
Boyle
Thiebaut. Freres
Fondeurs
(Base, circular bronze plaque:)
Fairmount Park Art Association
Presented 1888

== See also ==
- List of public art in Philadelphia
