= Statue of Benjamin Franklin (University of Pennsylvania) =

Statue outside College Hall, University of Pennsylvania, Philadelphia

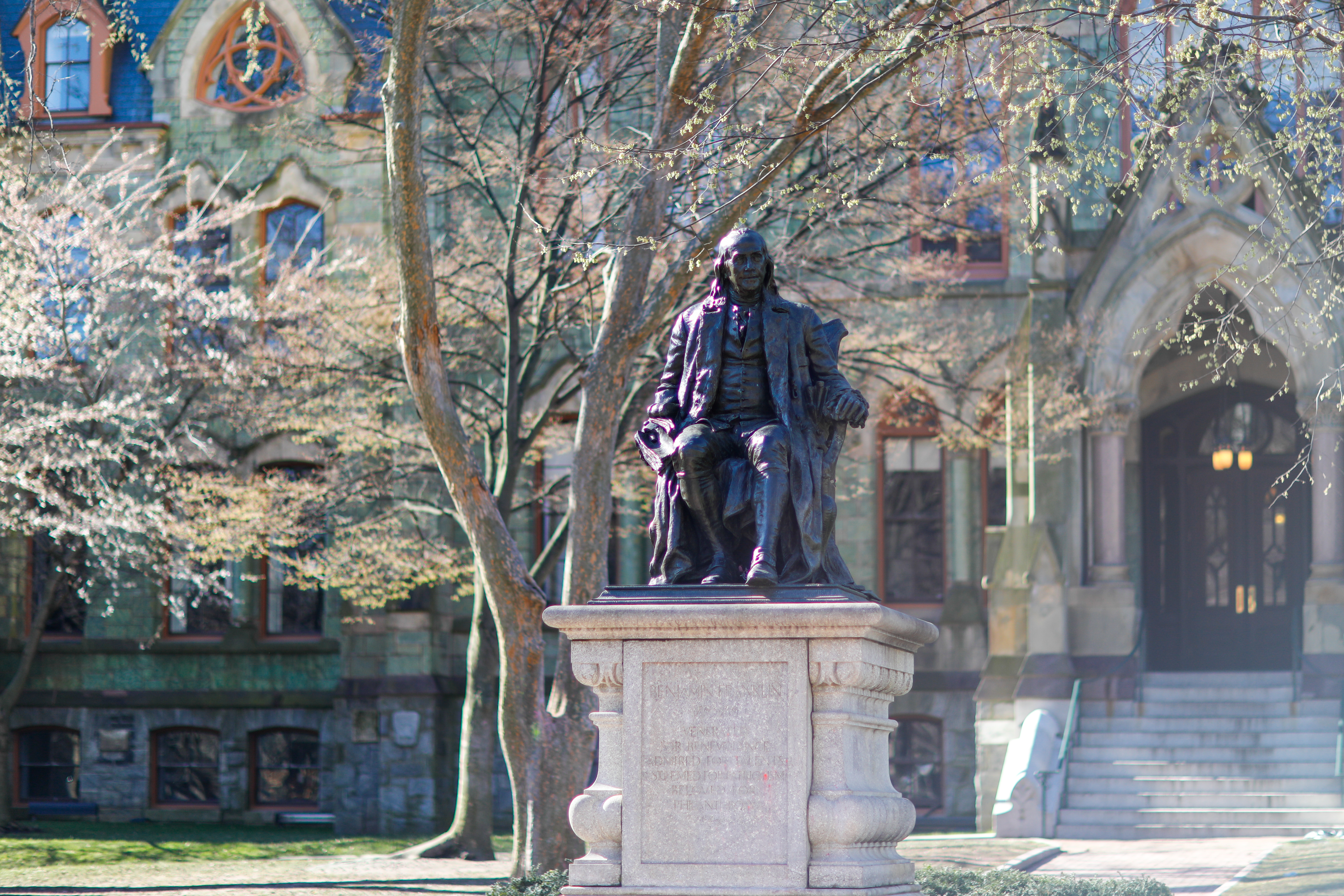
- Artist: John J. Boyle
- Year: 1896–1899
- Type: Bronze
- Dimensions: 230 cm × 130 cm × 150 cm (90 in × 53 in × 59 in)
- Location: University of Pennsylvania, Philadelphia, Pennsylvania, U.S.; 39°57′7″N 75°11′37.25″W
- Owner: University of Pennsylvania

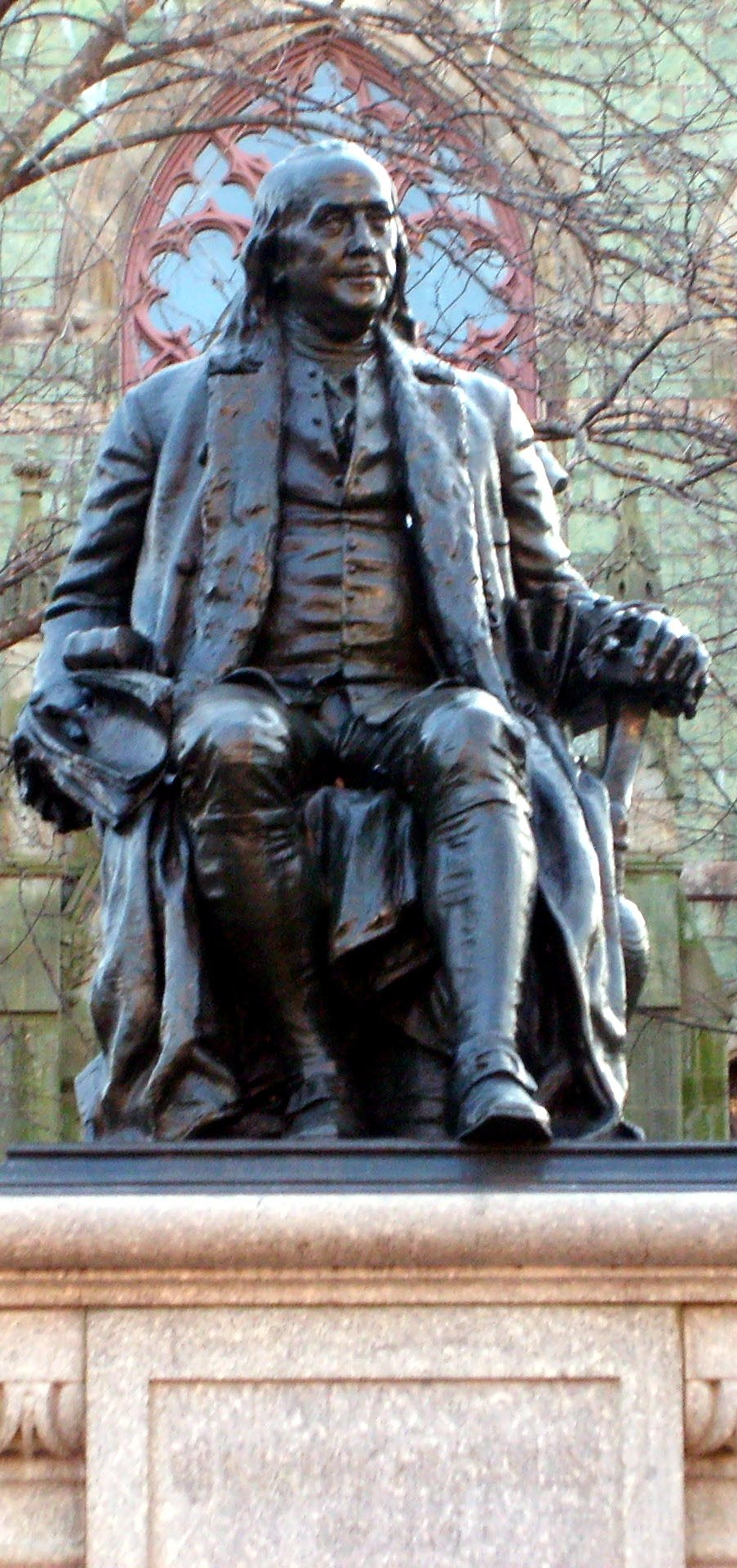
The statue of Benjamin Franklin on the University of Pennsylvania campus in Philadelphia

A bronze statue of a seated Benjamin Franklin by John J. Boyle is installed at the University of Pennsylvania in Philadelphia, Pennsylvania. It is located in front of College Hall, on Locust Walk, between 34th and 36th Streets, and is one of three statues of Franklin on the campus.

== Details ==
It was commissioned by department store founder Justus C. Strawbridge in 1896, as a gift to the City of Philadelphia. It was cast by the Henry-Bonnard Bronze Company of New York, and installed in 1899 in front of Philadelphia's Main Post Office, at 9th and Chestnut Streets. Benjamin Franklin was the first United States Postmaster General. The granite pedestal was designed by architect Frank Miles Day. Its inscription quotes President George Washington's eulogy of Franklin:

BENJAMIN FRANKLIN

1706–1790
VENERATED
FOR BENEVOLENCE
ADMIRED FOR TALENTS
ESTEEMED FOR PATRIOTISM
BELOVED FOR
PHILANTHROPY

WASHINGTON

(On back of pedestal):

PRESENTED TO THE CITY OF PHILADELPHIA BY JUSTUS C STRAWBRIDGE 1899

(On back of statue):

JOHN J. BOYLE 1899

HENRY-BONNARD BRONZE CO FOUNDERS NY 1899

GIFT OF JUSTUS C STRAWBRIDGE

A signed Founder's mark also appears on the back of the statue.

In 1938, when the Post Office was razed, the City gave the statue on permanent loan to the University of Pennsylvania, an Ivy League university in Philadelphia. Franklin was a founder of the university. It was relocated to the Penn campus, and rededicated on January 21, 1939.

It was cleaned and reinstalled in 1980.

== Replica ==
A copy of the statue was given by the New England Society to France in 1906. It is located at the Trocadéro in Paris.

== Gallery ==
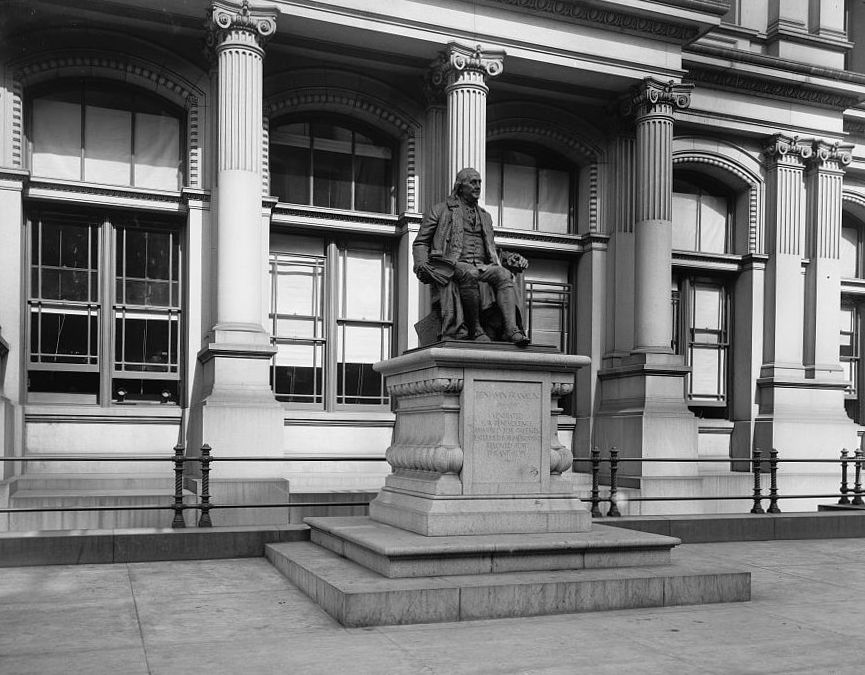
The statue in its original location outside the Main Post Office in Philadelphia, c. 1906

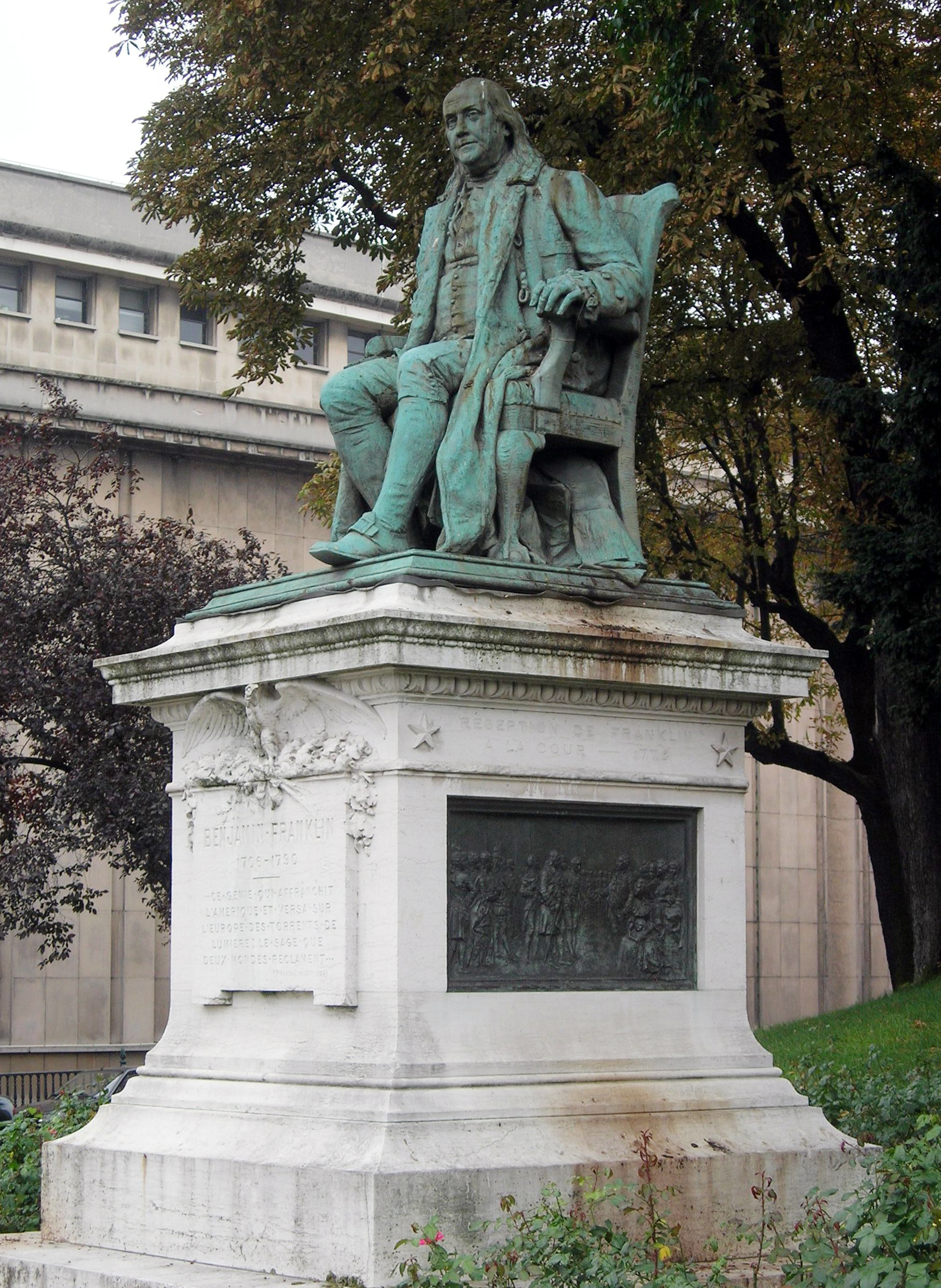
The cast in Paris

== See also ==
- Benjamin Franklin in popular culture
- List of public art in Philadelphia
