= The Alarm (Boyle) =

Sculpture by John Boyle

Coordinates: 41°56′10″N 87°37′57″W

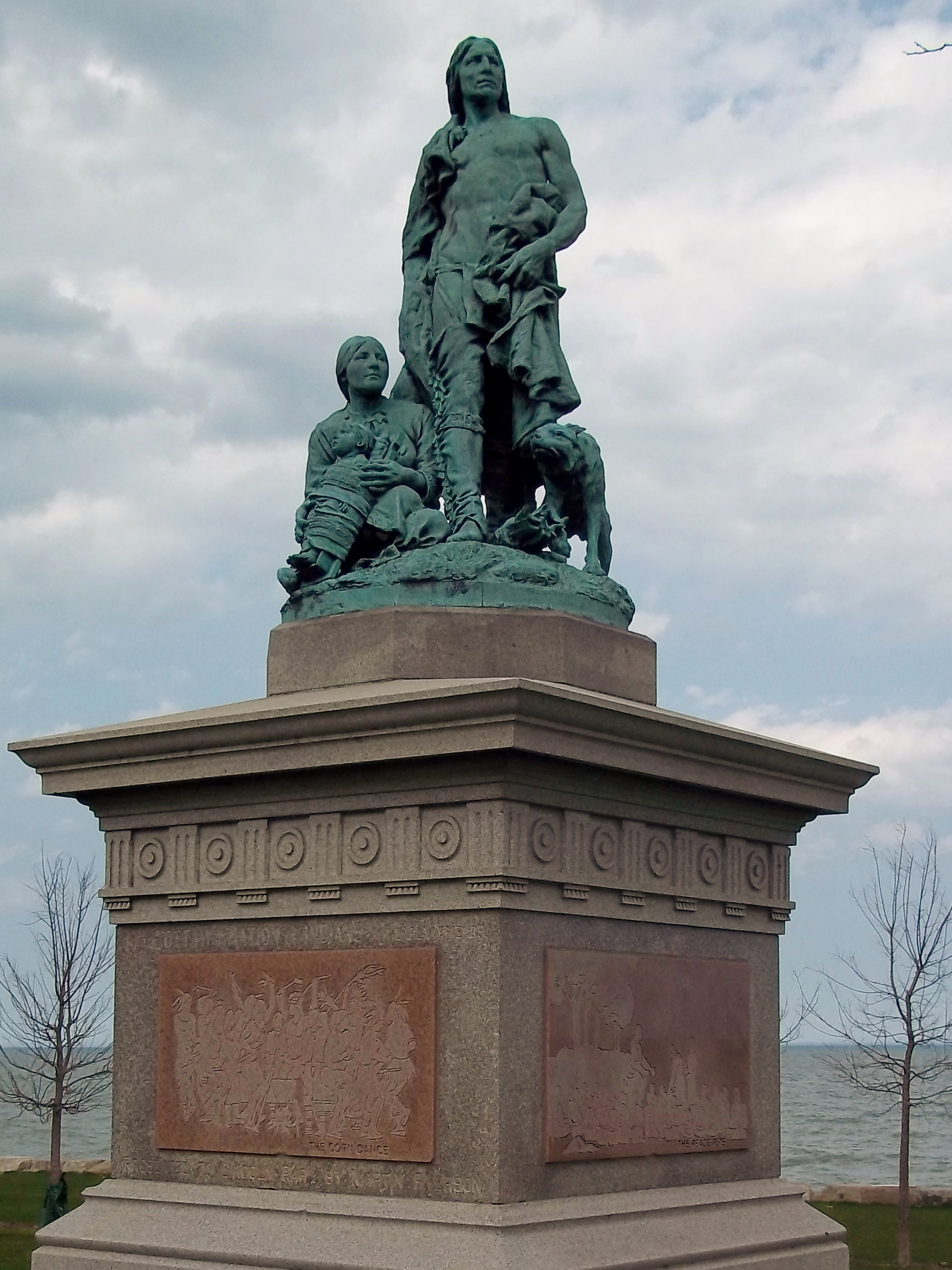

- Location in Chicago
- Artist: John J. Boyle
- Year: 1884
- Type: Bronze
- Dimensions: 180 cm × 110 cm × 110 cm (72 in × 42 in × 42 in)
- Location: Chicago, Illinois

The Alarm (Indian Alarm) is a Bronze statue by John J. Boyle located in Lincoln Park, Chicago. Commissioned in 1880, and dedicated on May 17, 1884, it shows a Native-American couple with infant and pet dog, looking with concern into the distance. On the base are four incised granite tablets (originally bronze reliefs) with scenes of Ottawa life: "The Peace Pipe," "The Corn Dance," "Forestry," and "The Hunt."

== History ==
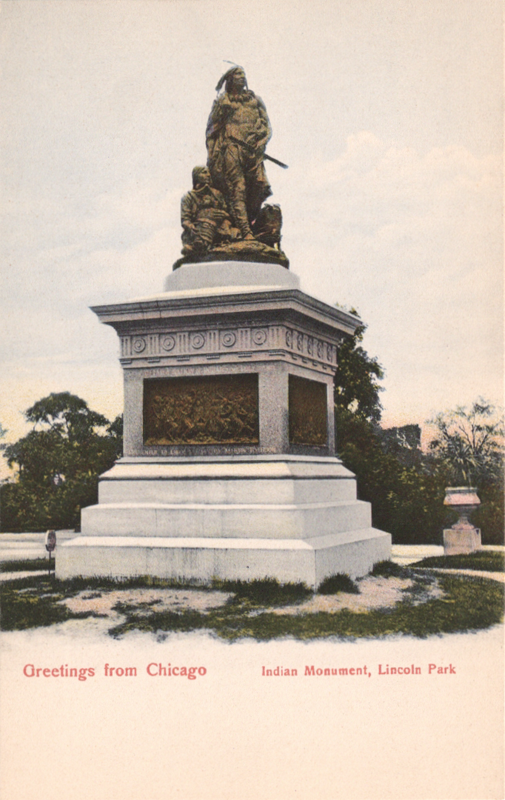
The monument in an early 20th century postcard. Note the arrows present in the hand of the male figure.

The sculpture was given to Lincoln Park by Martin Ryerson. It was display in the Lincoln Park Zoo, about one mile south of the current location, until 1974. Ryerson gave the sculpture as a memorial to the Ottawa Nation. It is the oldest sculpture on Chicago Park District property.

The inscription reads:
(Base front:)
Presented to Lincoln Park by Martin Ryerson.
(Base, on one granite tablet:)
The Peace Pipe
(Base, on another granite tablet:)
The Corn Dance
(Base, on another granite table:)
Forestry
(Base, on another granite table:)
The Hunt signed

== See also ==
- List of public art in Chicago
