= John J. Boyle (sculptor) =

American sculptor (1851–1917)

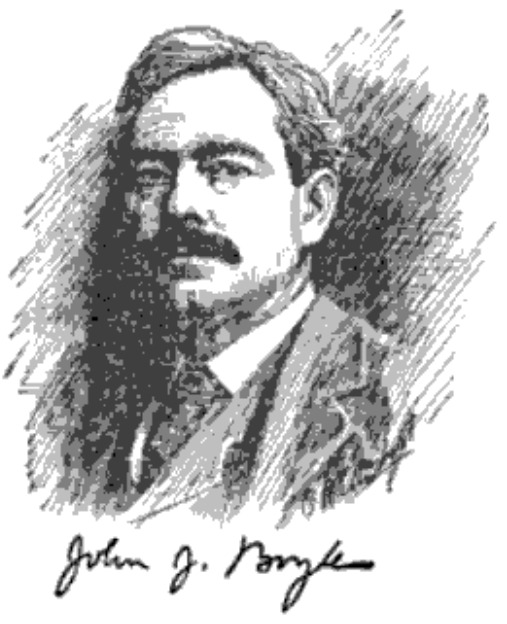
- An illustration of Boyle, c. 1906
- Born: John Joseph Boyle; January 12, 1851; New York City, U.S.
- Died: February 10, 1917 (aged 66); New York City, U.S.
- Education: Pennsylvania Academy of the Fine Arts École des Beaux Arts
- Known for: Sculpture
- Notable work: The Alarm (1884)
- Spouse: Elizabeth Carroll

John J. Boyle (January 12, 1851 – February 10, 1917) was an American sculptor active in Philadelphia in the last decades of the 19th century, known for his large-scale figurative bronzes in public settings, and, particularly, his portraiture of Native Americans.

== Early life and education ==
Boyle was born in New York City in 1851 to Samuel Boyle and Katharine McCauley. They moved to Pennsylvania prior to his first birthday. After his father's death in 1857, Boyle's remaining family, in straitened circumstances, moved to Philadelphia to live with relatives.

Boyle attended public schools in Philadelphia, then served an apprenticeship as a stone-cutter. In 1872, he began studying art at the PAFA, taking classes with Thomas Eakins and other faculty. Beginning in 1877, he studied at the École des Beaux Arts in Paris for three years, returning to the United States and marrying Elizabeth Carroll in Philadelphia in 1882.

== Career ==
=== Paris Salon ===
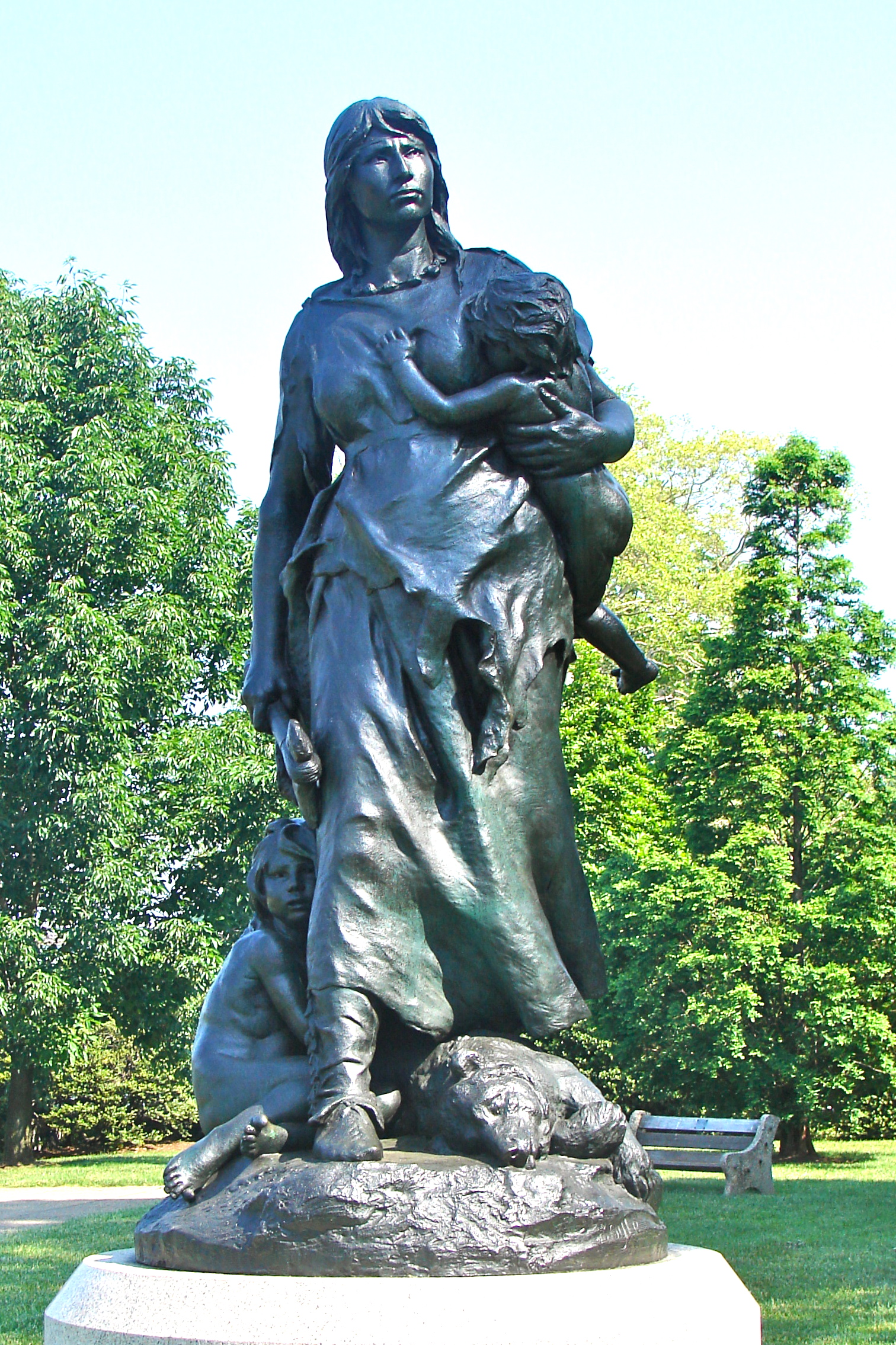
Boyle's bronze sculpture, Stone Age in America, completed in 1887 and now on display at the Ellen Philips Memorial Sculpture Garden in Philadelphia

Boyle's time in Paris established him as a successful, medaled ornament to the Salon, the official art exhibition of the Académie des Beaux-Arts in Paris (the École being the visual arts division of the Académie). Although he returned to the United States to secure commissions ~1880, he continued to show his works in Paris, joining company with the generation of Philadelphia artists who moved back and forth between Europe and the United States during this period.

By the mid to late 19th century, the Romantic Movement had begun to see expression in the United States, particularly in the artistic circle centered at Philadelphia's PAFA, moving away from the "Grand Style" of the first part of the 19th century. John Boyle, "authentic in his rude strength," was among those active in this form.

This was a period of many firsts for American artists. Boyle would become known for his portraits of Native Americans, bolstered by an 1880 two month domicile among the Sioux in the Dakotas. The Alarm, commissioned by Martin Ryerson for Lincoln Park in Chicago, was intended to commemorate local Ottawa tribes, as part of a monument which originally included four bas-relief panels entitled The Peace Pipe, The Corn Dance, Forestry and The Hunt on its base (these original panels were stolen in the 1960s and replaced with sand-blasted reproductions).

=== World's Fair Participation ===
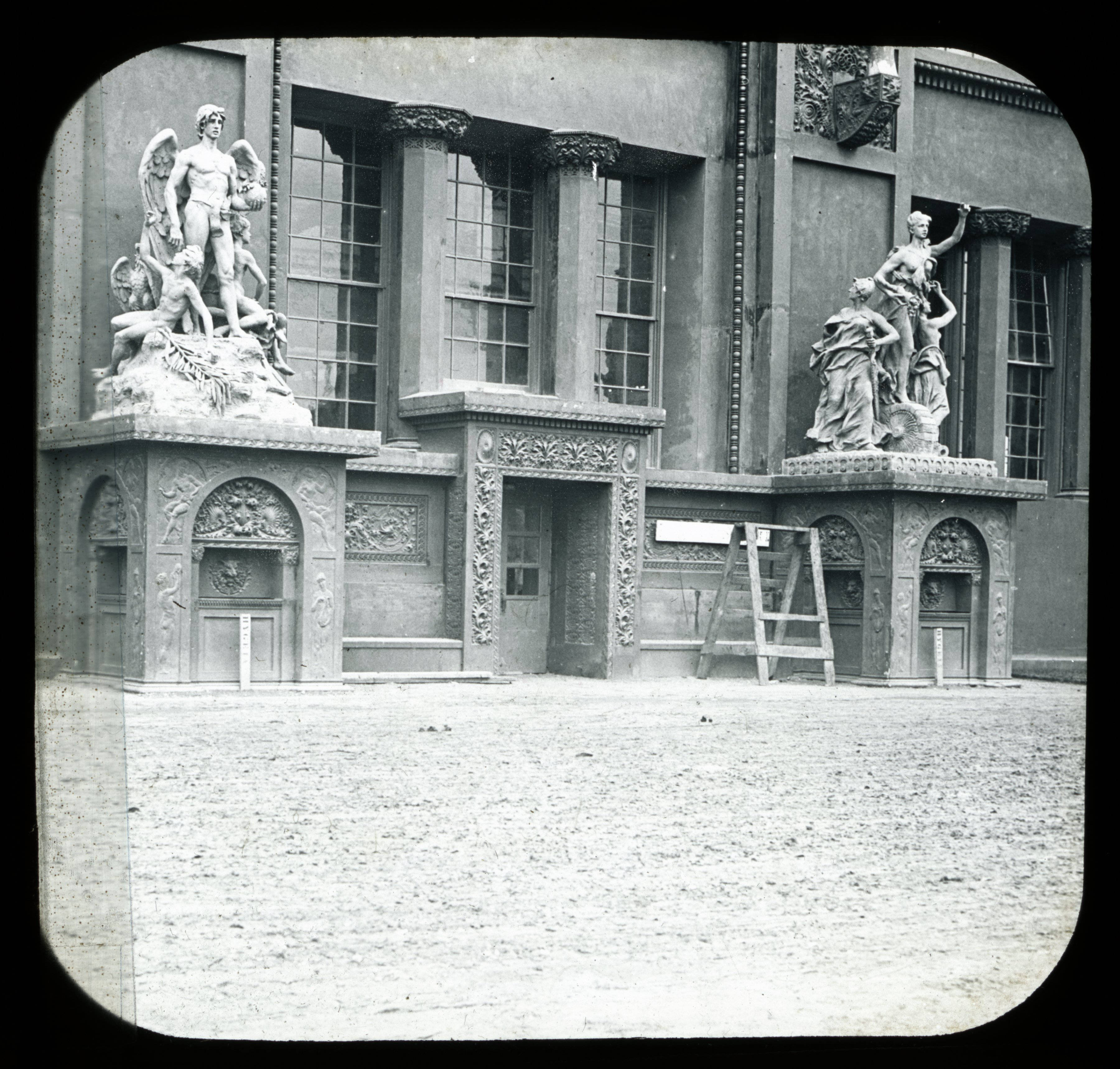
Statuary, Transportation Building, 1893 Columbian Exposition, Chicago

Boyle's prominence in the Philadelphia art scene by the 1890s was reflected by commissions for the Art Club of Philadelphia, including the design of their gold medal award, a prestigious form of social recognition. Along with other noted artists and architects of the 1890s, Boyle was invited to participate in the Chicago World Fair of 1893 (the Columbian Exposition).

Artistic advisor Augustus Saint-Gaudens delegated the "career-enhancing commissions for monumental sculptures that promoted the exposition's overarching theme of national identity," to a select group of sculptors it was felt would portray young America in its most promising light. He entrusted with the responsibility of supervising the sculptural decoration of the Louis Sullivan Transportation Building, work that was to include "five huge bas-reliefs, and eight triads of figures of heroic size, besides eight symbolical as well as allegorical figures," employing a staff of sculptors to complete his designs. Executed in "staff," an impermanent mixture of plaster of Paris and fibrous materials, it was not expected that these works would endure beyond the fair's closing, but the scale, not merely for Boyle's work, but for 1893 America, went well beyond projects previously achieved. "For the sculptors whose works were displayed outdoors on the fairgrounds as well as in the Fine Arts Building, the World's Columbian Exposition was a professional and aesthetic coming of age," a "full flowering" of a naturalistic Beaux-Arts aesthetic that left the static formalism of neo-classicism behind.

The success of Boyle's work in this venue cemented his reputation as a sculptor for American ideals, leading to commissions in Washington in the newly built Library of Congress building (figures of Sir Francis Bacon and Plato, bronze, 1894–1896) in Washington, D.C.

=== Public works ===
Boyle's statue of Benjamin Franklin for the Philadelphia Post office followed (1896–1899), followed by an invitation to participate in the Pan-American Exposition of 1901. He was appointed a member of the Art Commission of Greater New York January 1, 1906. In New York, he and his wife spent their later years. He was a member of many artistic clubs, including the National Sculpture Society, The Architectural League of New York, the T-Square Club of Philadelphia, and the National Arts Club and was still actively at work on a public project for the U.S. government, Commodore John Barry, now on display in Franklin Square in Washington, D.C., when he died in February 1917.

== Death ==
Boyle died from pneumonia at his home in New York City on February 10, 1917. Behests by his wife to the PAFA in his memory included Tired out a bronze statue of a Native American subject completed in 1887.

== Legacy ==
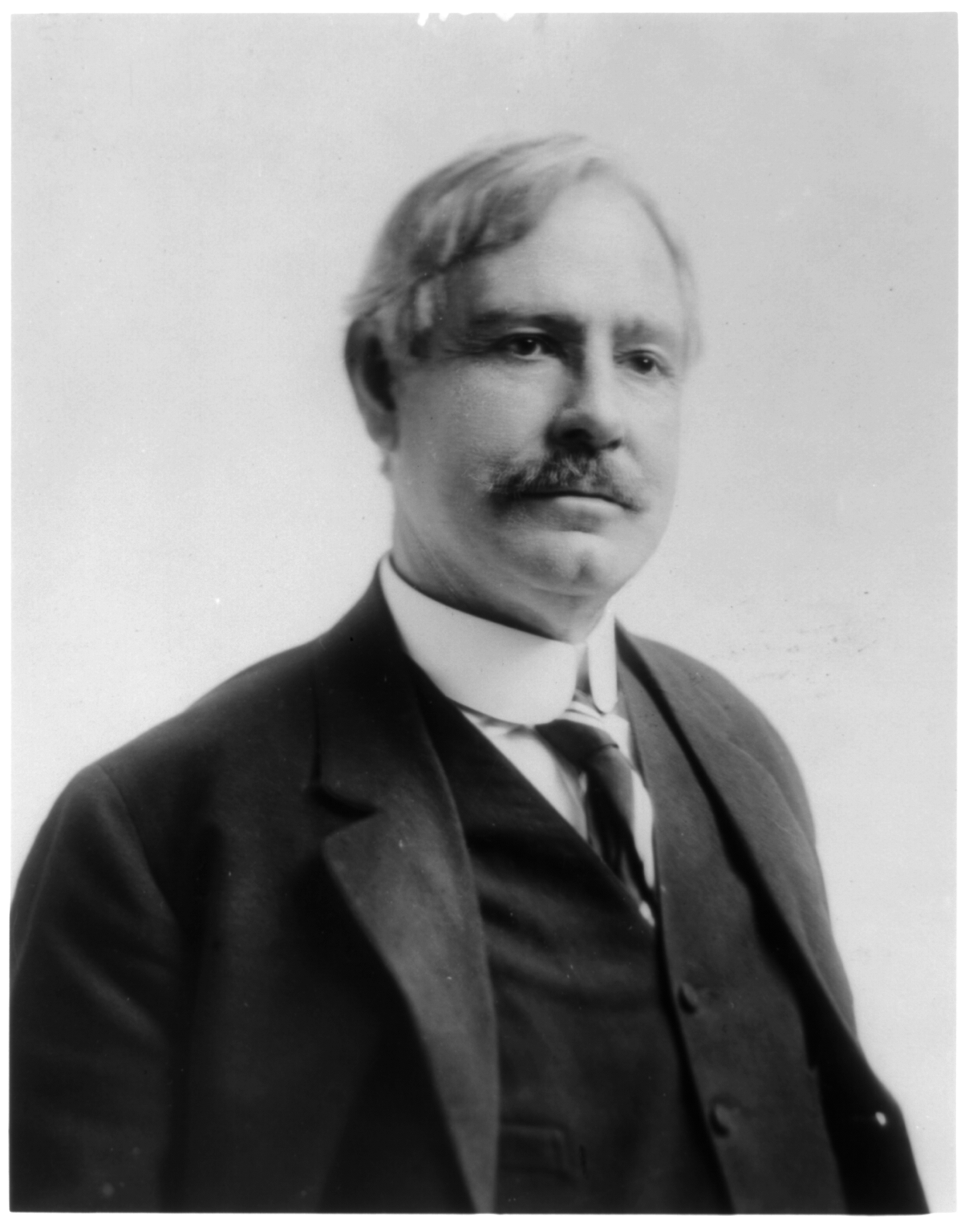
John J. Boyle, 1914 (Library of Congress)

Boyle spent the last years of his life in New York City. In 1910, he was elected into the National Academy of Design as an Associate member.

== Selected works ==
- The Alarm, (Indian Alarm) (1884), Lincoln Park in Chicago
- Stone Age in America (1887), Fairmount Park in Philadelphia
- Tammany, 42nd New York Infantry Memorial (1891), Gettysburg Battlefield in Gettysburg, Pennsylvania
- Sir Francis Bacon (1894–1896) at the Library of Congress in Washington, D.C.
- Plato (1894–1896) at the Library of Congress in Washington, D.C.
- Benjamin Franklin (1896–1899) at the University of Pennsylvania in Philadelphia. A replica was exhibited at the 1904 Saint Louis World's Fair in St. Louis
- Bust of Charles Lenning (1900) at the University of Pennsylvania in Philadelphia
- The Savage Age in the Eastern Hemisphere (1901) at the Pan-American Exposition in Buffalo, New York
- The Savage Age in the Western Hemisphere (1901) at the Pan-American Exposition in Buffalo, New York
- Bust of James V. Brown (1907) at the James V. Brown Library in Williamsport, Pennsylvania
- John Christian Bullitt (1907) at City Hall in Philadelphia
- Rebecca at the Well (1908) in Fairmount Park in Philadelphia
- Commodore John Barry (1911–1914) at Franklin Square in Washington, D.C.

== Gallery ==
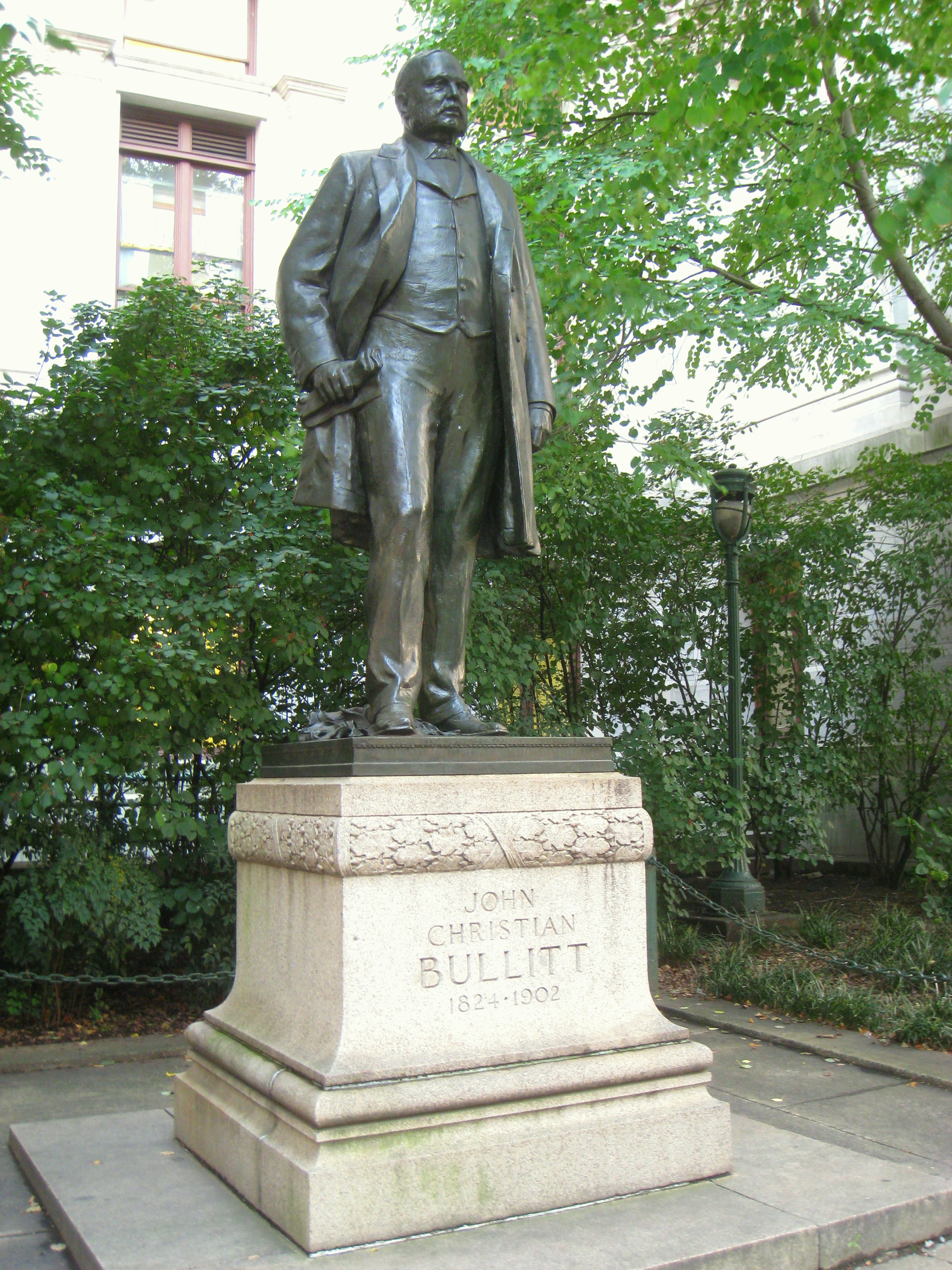
John Christian Bullitt sculpture on Philadelphia City Hall by John J. Boyle

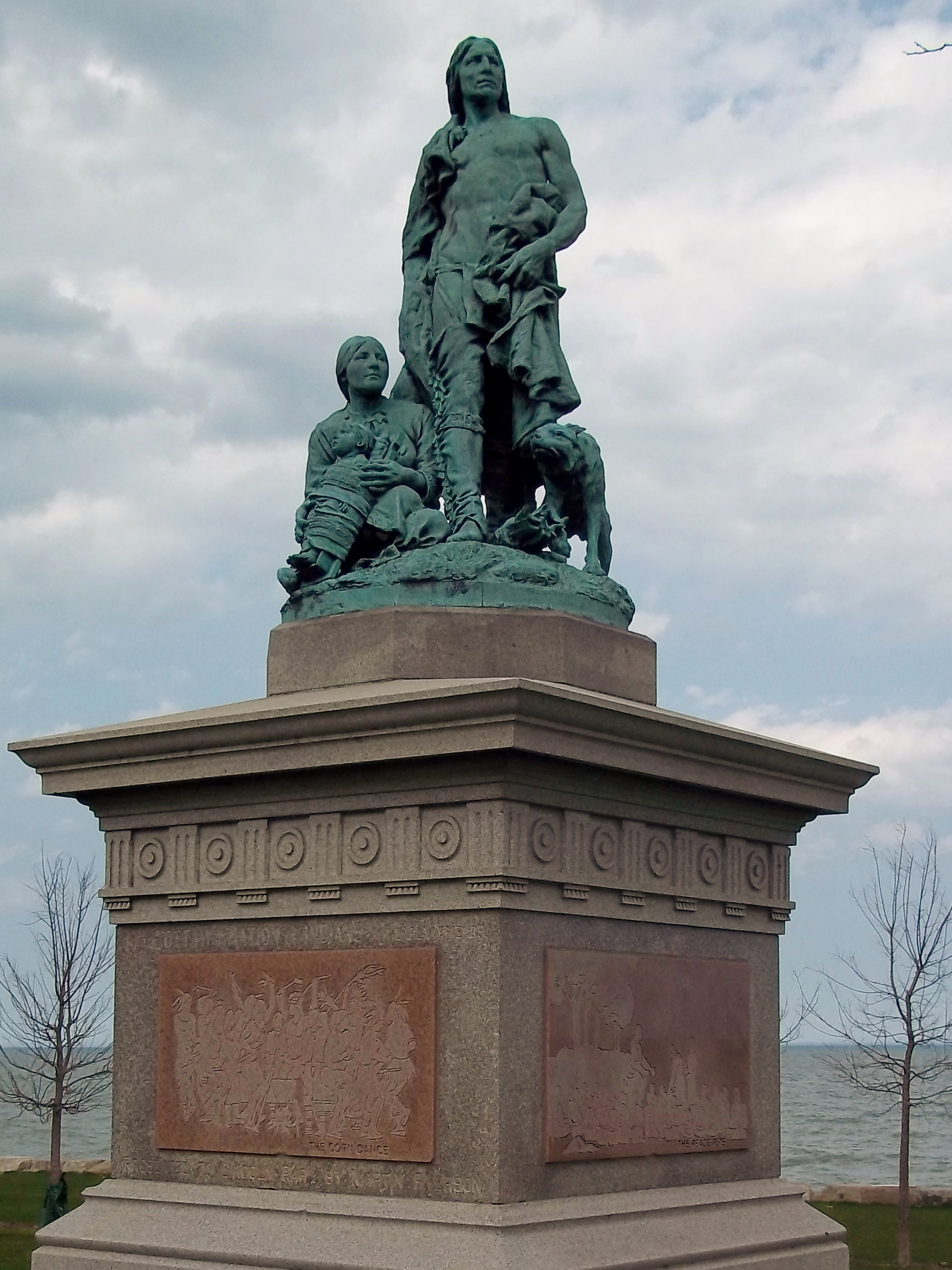
Indian Alarm (1884) at Lincoln Park in Chicago, Illinois

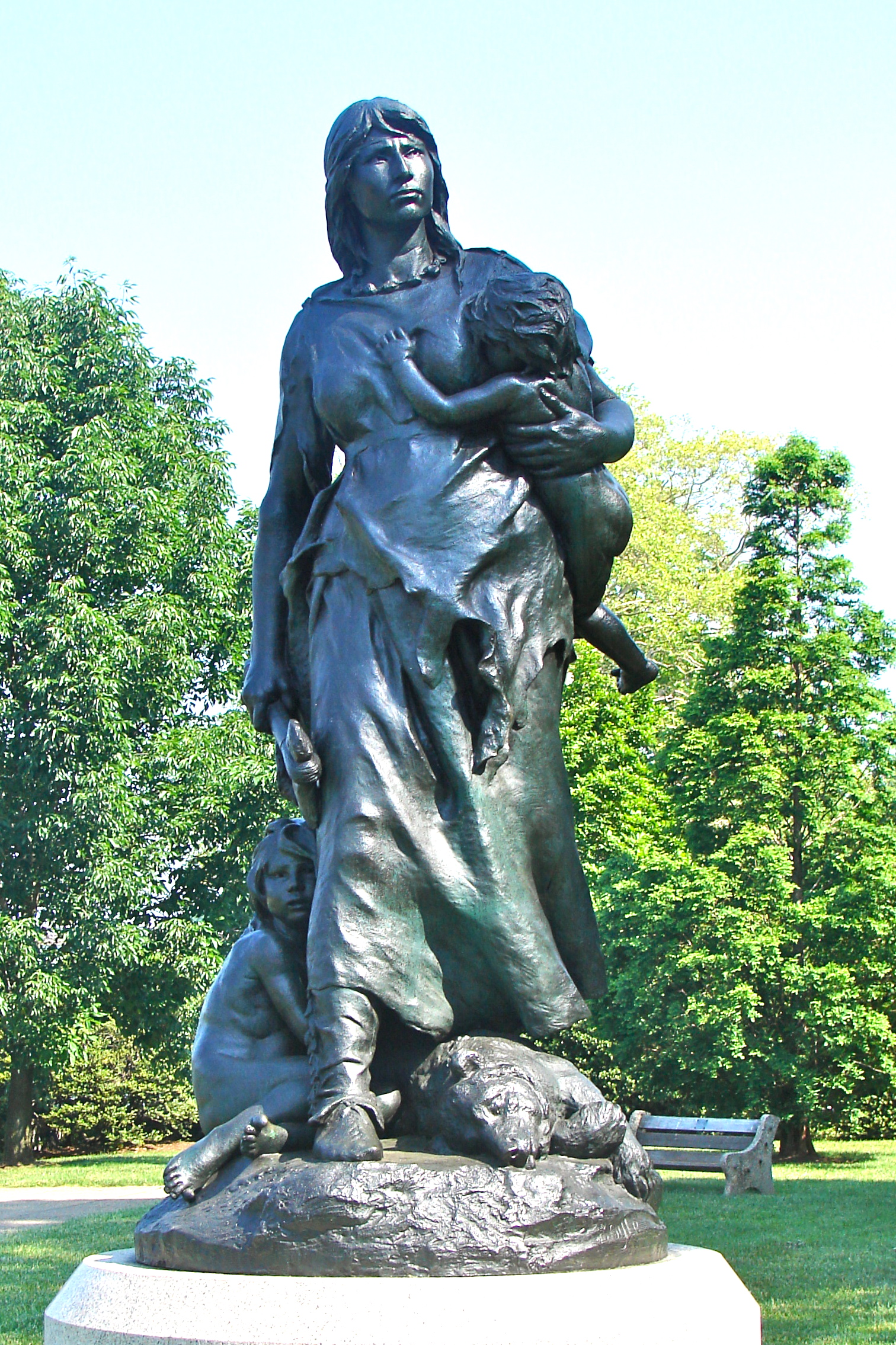
Stone Age in America (1887) at Fairmount Park in Philadelphia

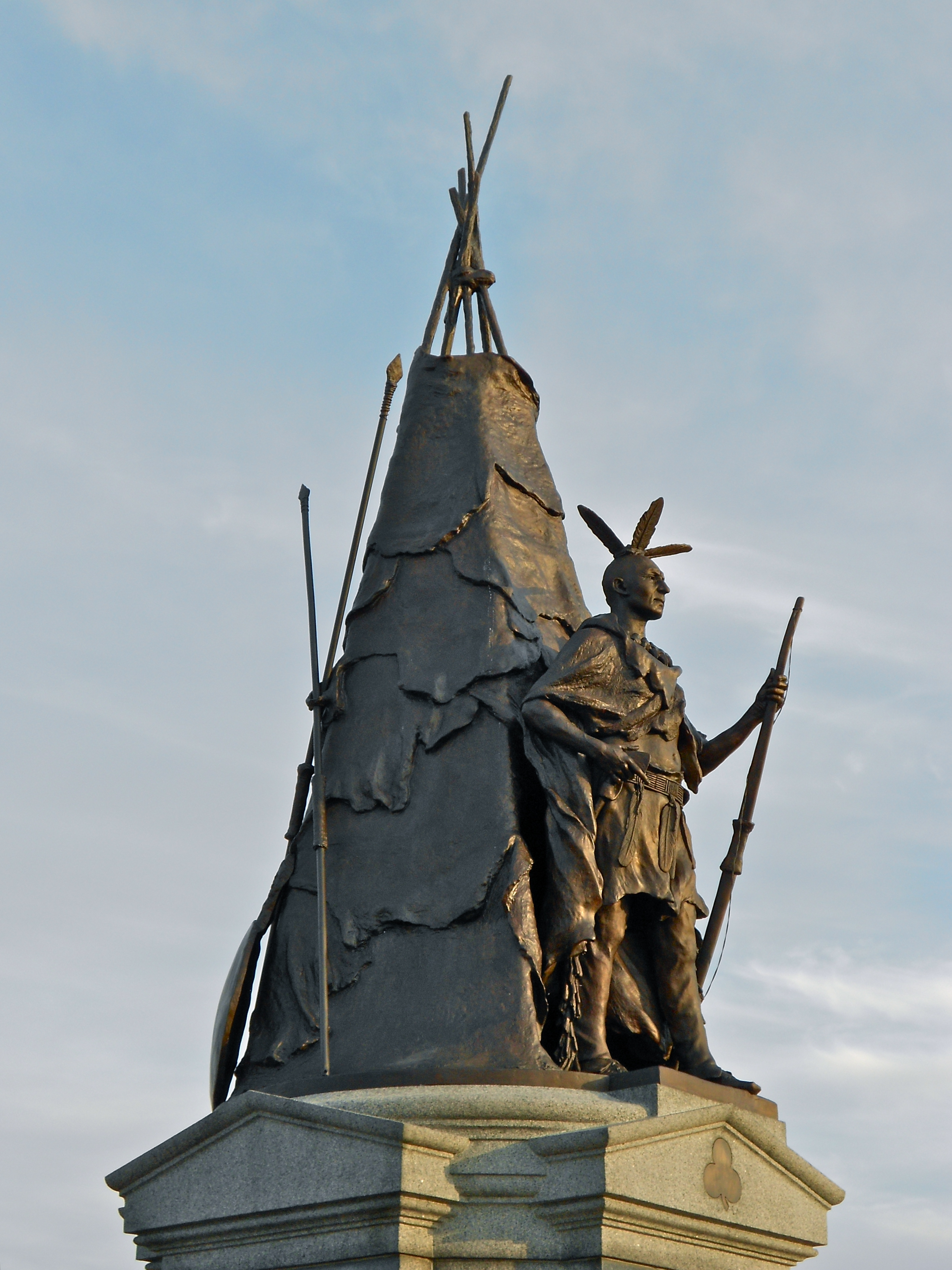
Tammany, 42nd New York Infantry Memorial (1891) at Gettysburg Battlefield in Gettysburg, Pennsylvania

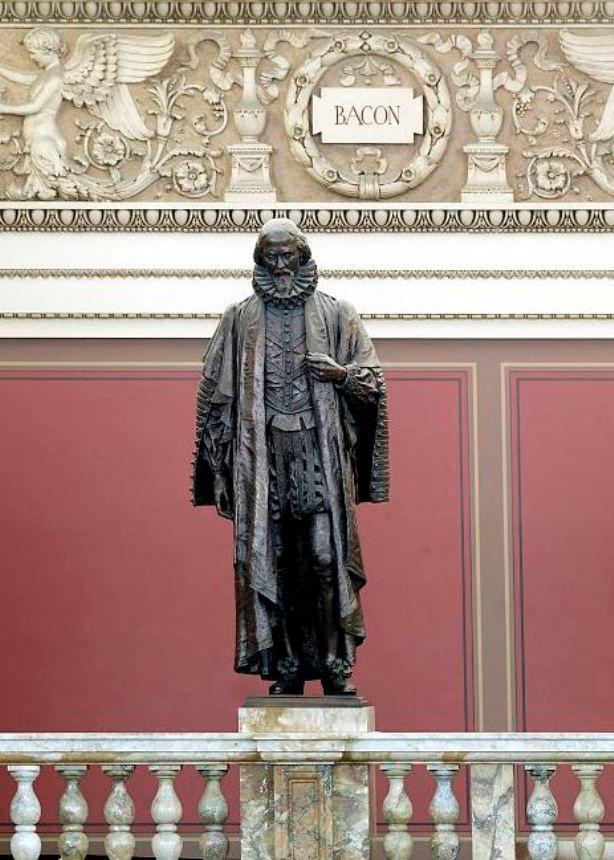
Sir Francis Bacon (1894–1896) at the Library of Congress in Washington, D.C.

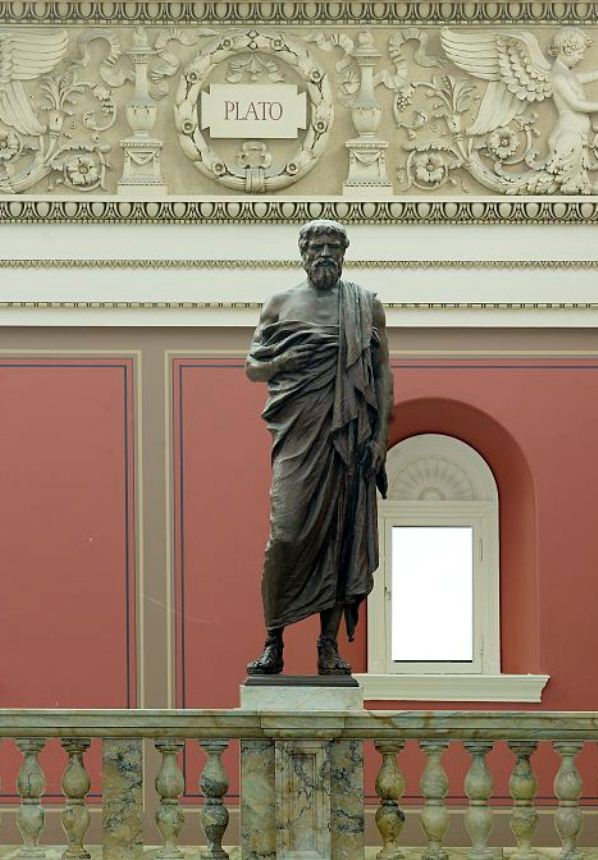
Plato (1894–1896) at the Library of Congress in Washington, D.C.

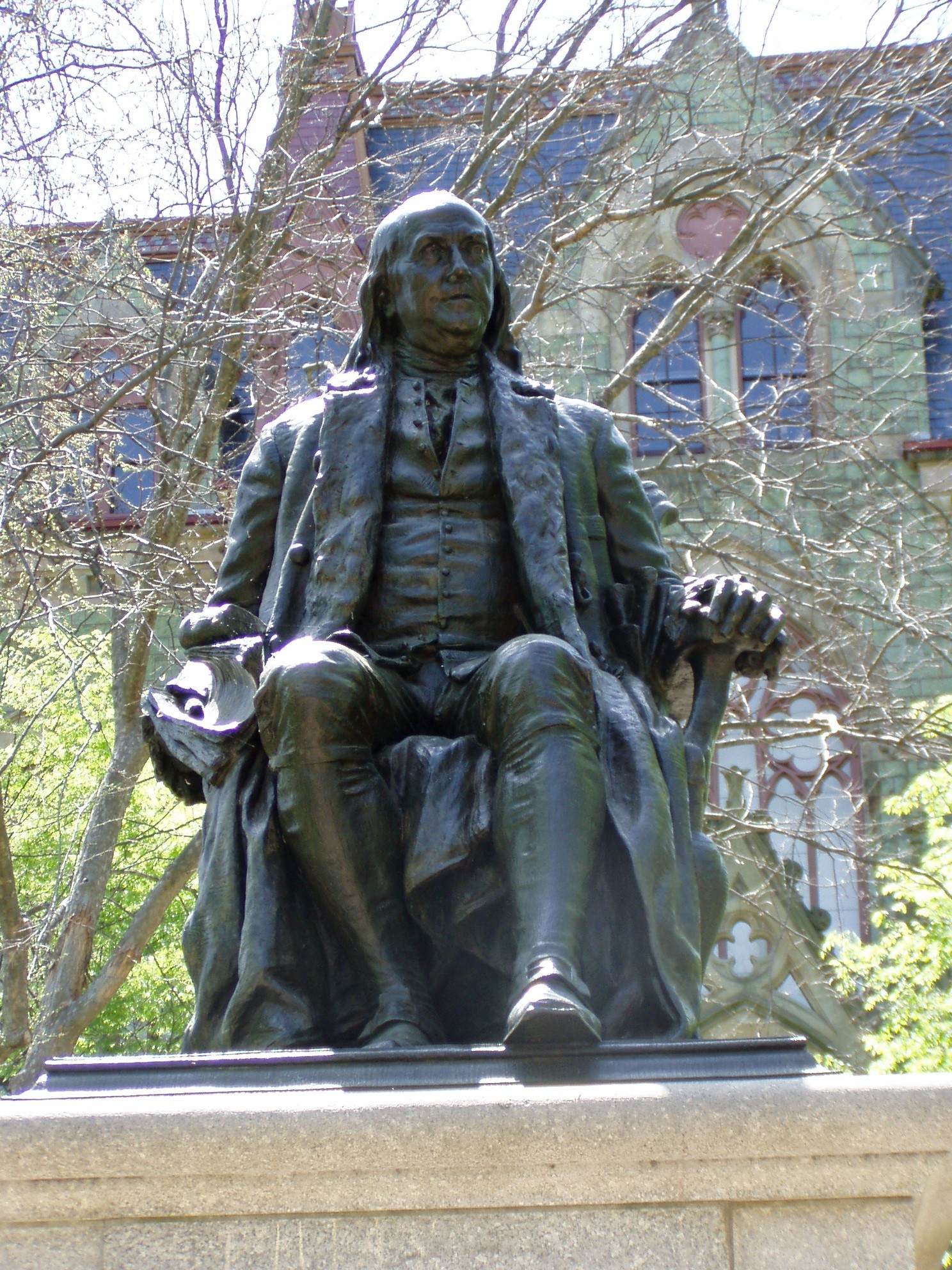
Benjamin Franklin (1896–1899) at the University of Pennsylvania in Philadelphia

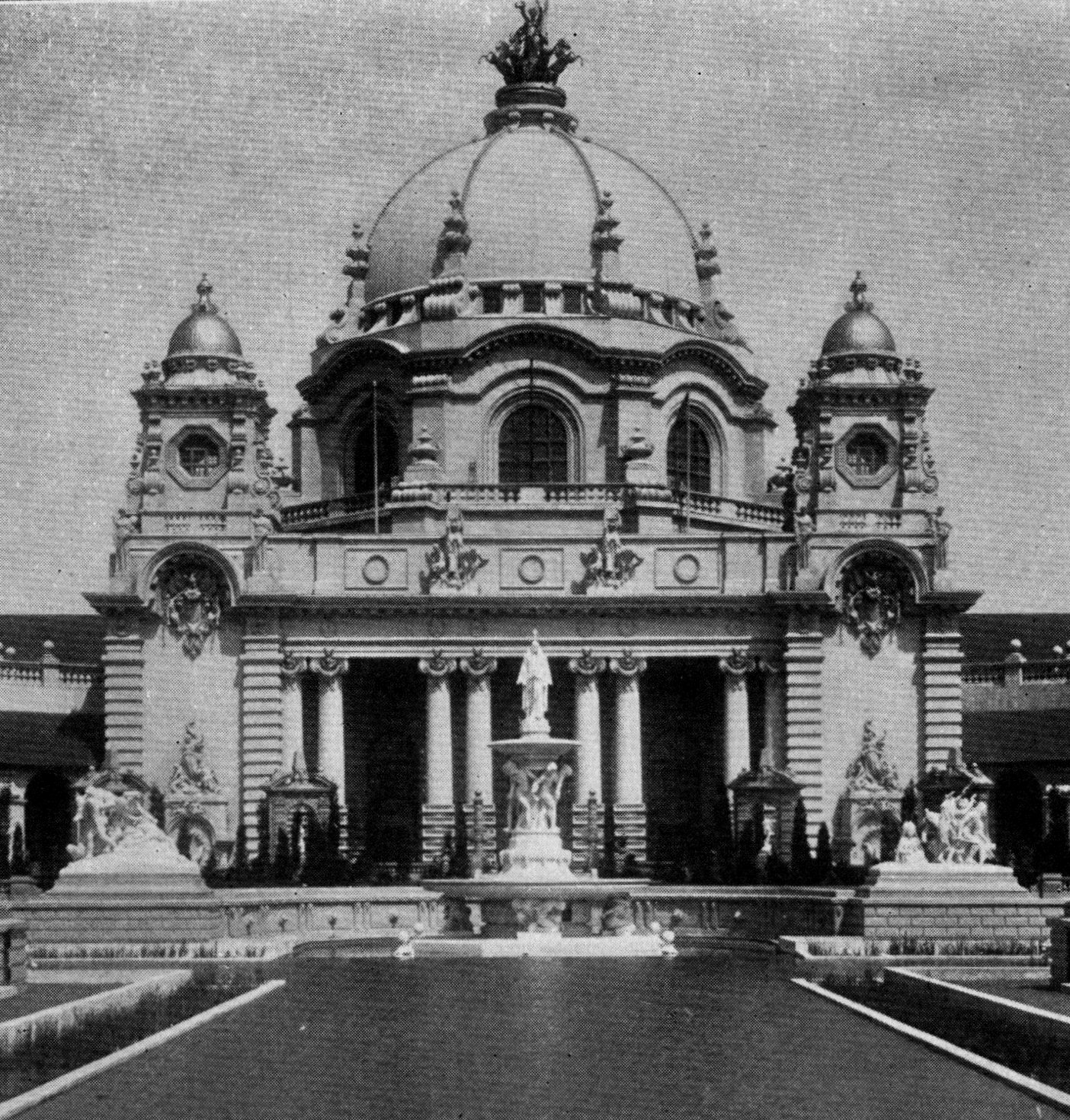
Pan-American Exposition (1901). Charles Grafly's Fountain of Man is center. Boyle's The Savage Age in the Eastern Hemisphere is left; The Savage Age in the Western Hemisphere is right.

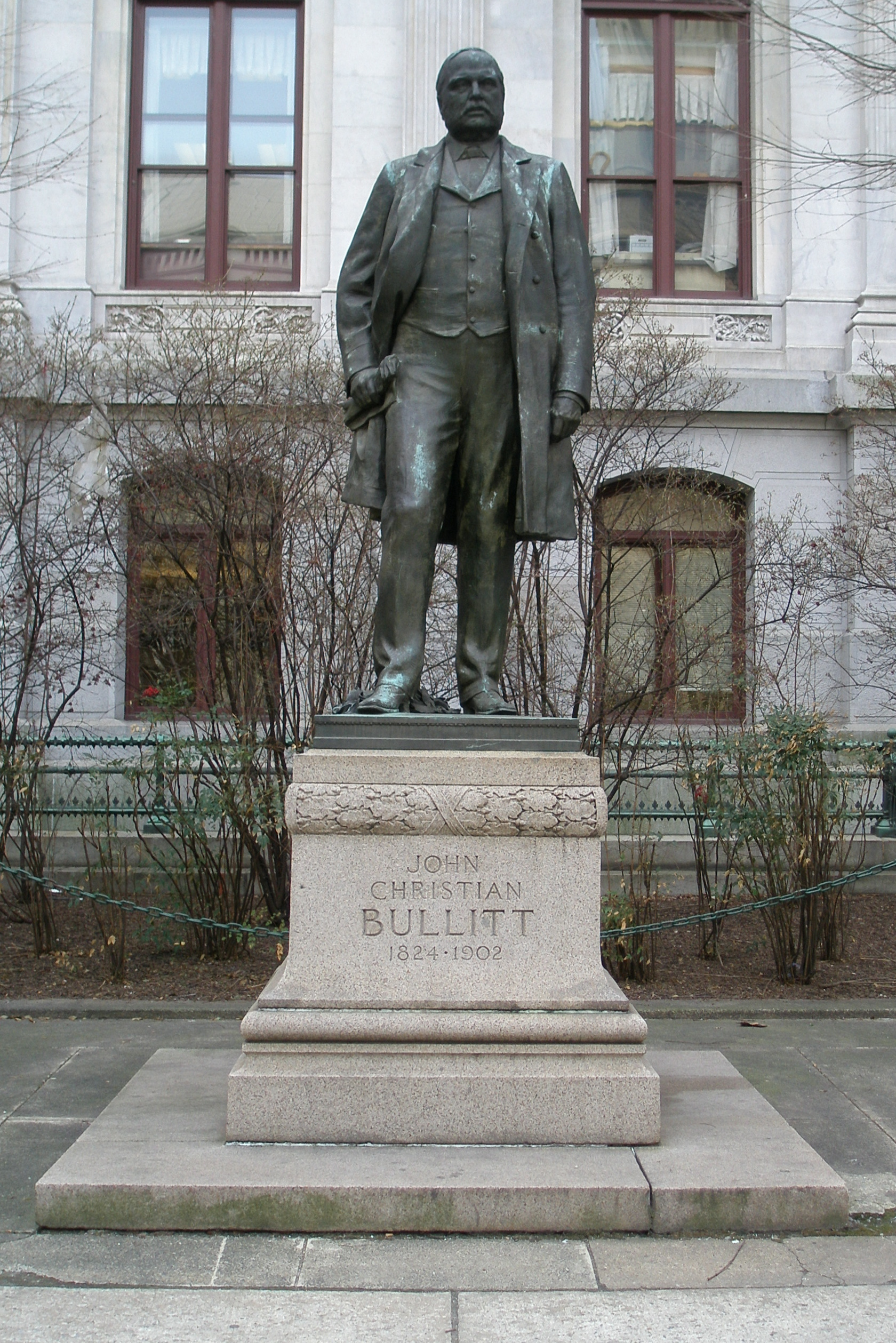
John Christian Bullitt (1907) at City Hall in Philadelphia

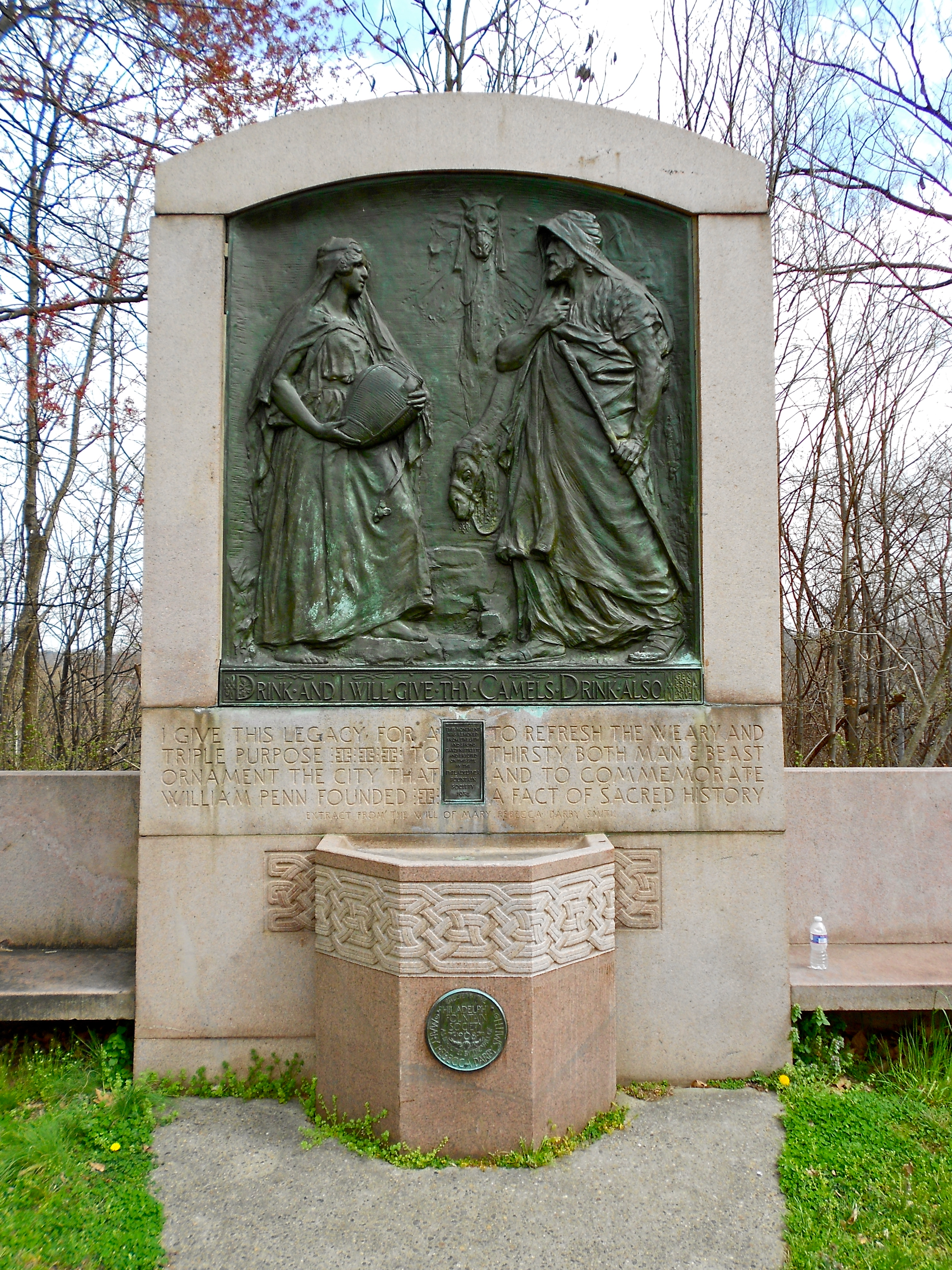
Rebecca at the Well (1908) at Fairmount Park in Philadelphia

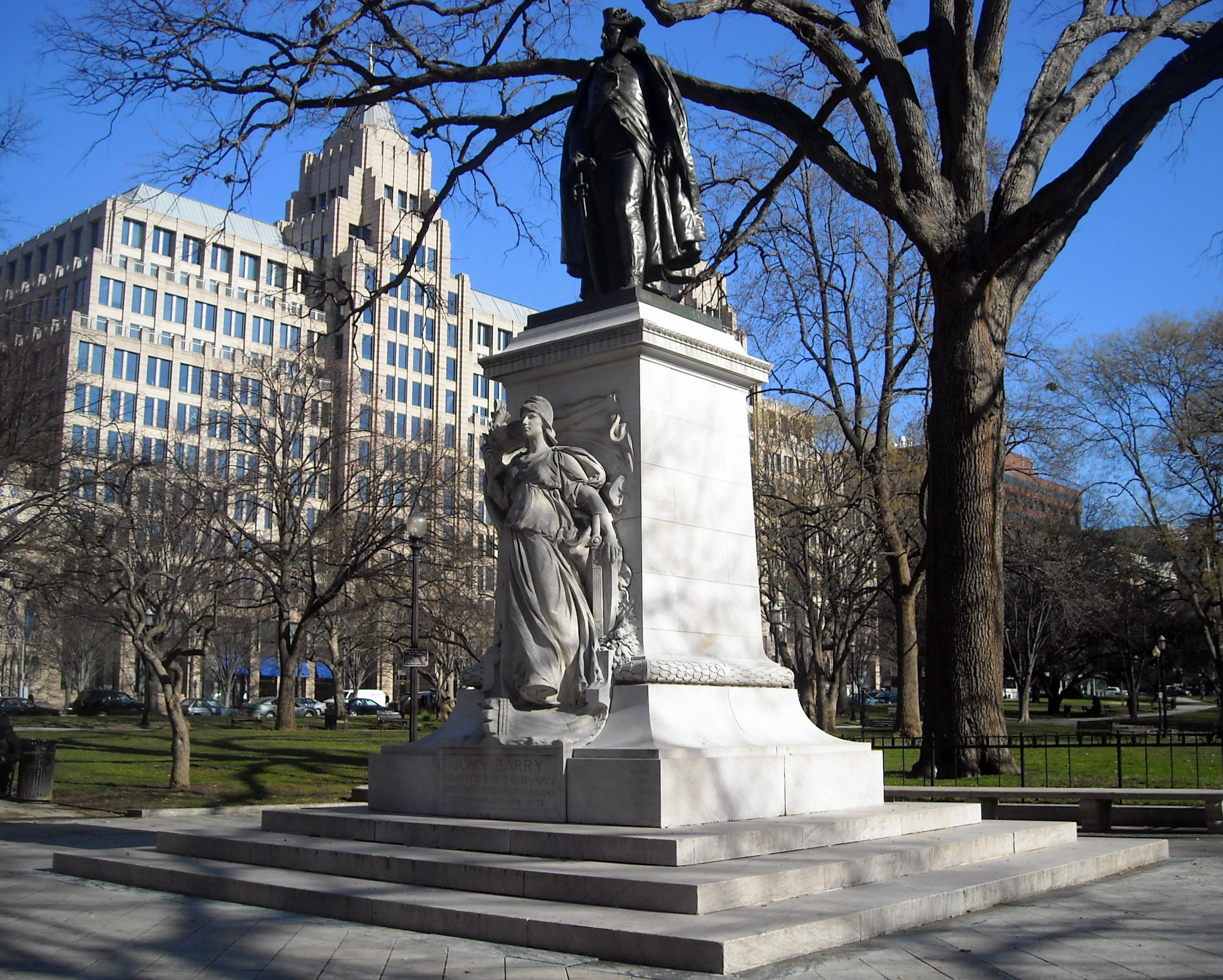
Commodore John Barry (1911–1914) at Franklin Square in Washington, D.C.
