= John Christian Bullitt (Boyle) =

Statue in Philadelphia, Pennsylvania, USA

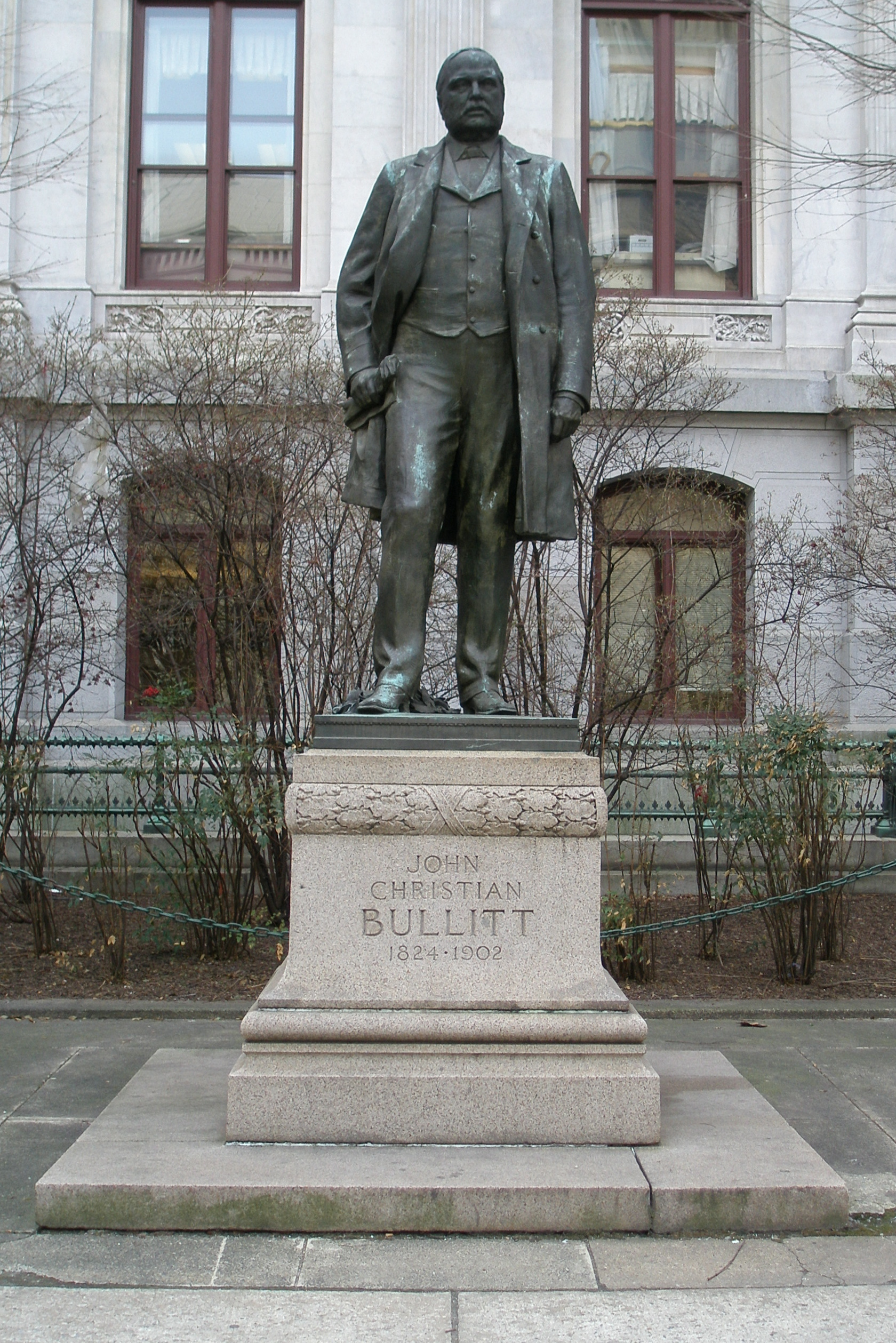
- Artist: John J. Boyle
- Year: 1907
- Type: Bronze
- Dimensions: 300 cm × 99 cm × 97 cm (118 in × 39 in × 38 in)
- Location: Philadelphia, Pennsylvania, United States; 39°57′11.28″N 75°9′50.34″W

John Christian Bullitt is a bronze statue by John J. Boyle. It is located in the north plaza of Philadelphia City Hall, at Broad Street, and JFK Boulevard. It was unveiled in July 1907.

The inscription reads:
(Lower proper left side:)
JOHN J BOYLE, SC, 1907
(Lower proper right side:)
ROMAN BRONZE WORKS, NEW YORK
(Base, front:)
JOHN
CHRISTIAN
BULLITT
1842-1892

External videos
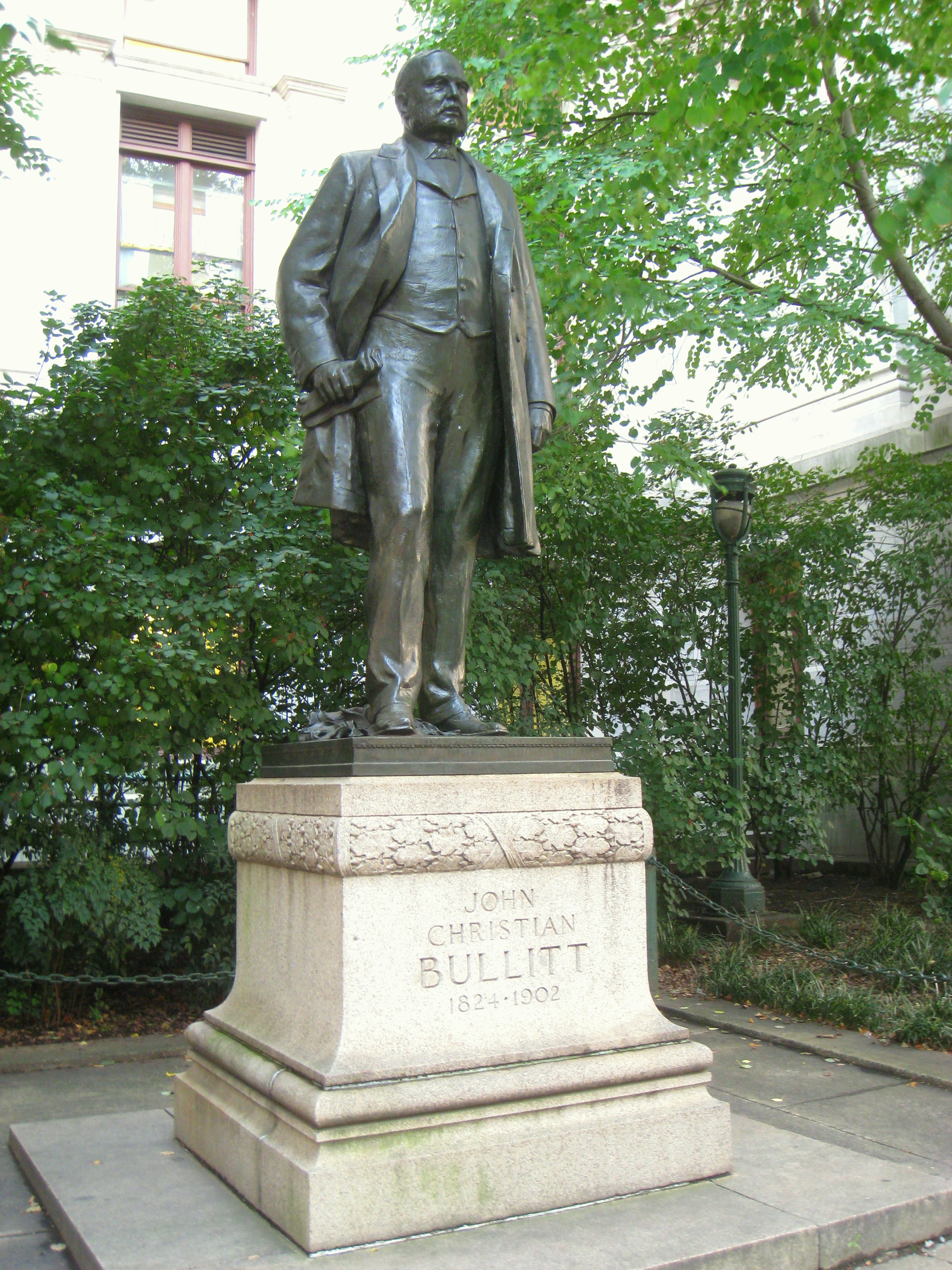
- John Christian Bullitt by artist John J. Boyle, Association for Public Art

== See also ==
- List of public art in Philadelphia
