= Equestrian statue of Winfield Scott =

Equestrian statue by Henry Kirke Brown

Brevet Lt. General Winfield Scott
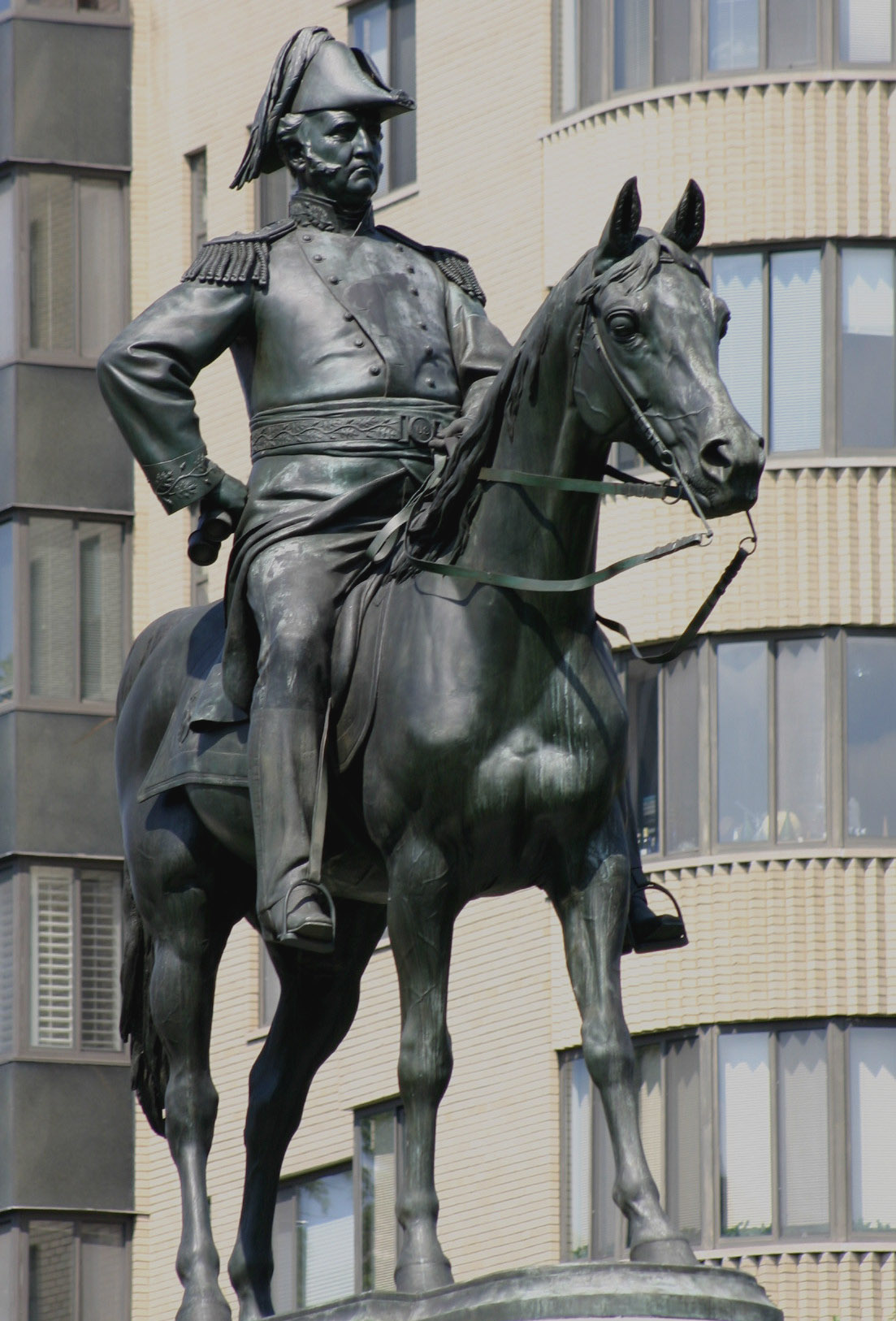
- Interactive map of Brevet Lt. General Winfield Scott
- Location: Scott Circle, Washington, D.C., United States
- Coordinates: 38.907239°N 77.0365089°W
- Equestrian statue of Winfield Scott
- U.S. National Register of Historic Places
- U.S. Historic district – Contributing property
- Part of: Civil War Monuments in Washington, D.C.
- NRHP reference No.: 78000257
- Added to NRHP: September 20, 1978
- Designer: Henry Kirke Brown (sculptor); George Edward Harney or Orville E. Babcock (architect); Robert Wood & Company (founder); Jonas H. French (stonework)
- Material: Bronze (sculpture); Granite (base)
- Length: 10 feet (3.0 m)
- Height: 15 feet (4.6 m)
- Opening date: 1874
- Dedicated to: Winfield Scott

Brevet Lt. General Winfield Scott is an equestrian statue in Washington, D.C., that honors career military officer Winfield Scott. The monument stands in the center of Scott Circle, a traffic circle and small park at the convergence of 16th Street, Massachusetts Avenue and Rhode Island Avenue NW. The statue was sculpted by Henry Kirke Brown, whose best-known works include statues of George Washington in New York and Nathanael Greene in Washington, D.C. It was the first of many sculptures honoring Civil War generals that were installed in Washington, D.C.'s traffic circles and squares and was the second statue in the city to honor Scott.

The sculpture is one of the city's 18 Civil War monuments that were collectively listed on the National Register of Historic Places in 1978. The monument and park are owned and maintained by the National Park Service, a federal agency of the Interior Department. The bronze statue rests on a granite base that at the time was the largest stone ever quarried in the United States. Much criticized for its depiction of Scott and the proportions of the horse, it is considered one of the worst equestrian sculptures in the city by authors and historians.

== History ==
=== Background ===
Winfield Scott (1786–1866), nicknamed "Old Fuss and Feathers" and the "Grand Old Man of the Army", served on active duty as general longer than any other American officer. During his 53-year career, he led forces during several wars, including the War of 1812, Black Hawk War, Mexican–American War, Seminole Wars, and Civil War. He served under every president from Thomas Jefferson to Abraham Lincoln. His twenty-year service as Commanding General of the United States Army was the longest in that post's history. His popularity following the Mexican–American War resulted in Scott being nominated the Whig Party candidate in the 1852 presidential election.

Following Scott's death in 1866, veterans and other citizens began lobbying for a monument to honor the general. On March 3, 1867, Congress authorized $35,000 for the erection of an equestrian statue. The monument was reauthorized by Congress on July 15, 1870, and on June 10, 1872. The artist selected was Henry Kirke Brown (1814–1886), a sculptor from New York whose 1856 equestrian statue of George Washington in Union Square, Manhattan, had been well received by critics. His other works in Washington, D.C. include Major General Nathanael Greene in Stanton Park and busts of Vice Presidents George Clinton and John C. Breckinridge, poet William Cullen Bryant, Major General Philip Kearny, and Senators Henry Clay and Richard Stockton.

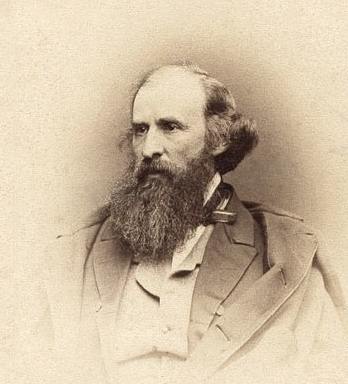
Henry Kirke Brown in 1870.

The model of the statue was completed around 1872. The federal government contributed bronze cannons captured by Scott during the Mexican–American War to use for casting the statue. Before the casting began, descendants of Scott saw the model and protested the design. Brown had designed the horse to be a small mare, which Scott preferred to ride, instead of a stallion. The descendants argued that no other general had been portrayed riding a mare and that a horse with flared nostrils and arched neck would be more suitable. Brown was annoyed by the requests and only made minimal modifications to the design, resulting in Scott, a tall and heavy man measuring 6.5 ft (2.0 m) and weighing 300 lb (140 kg), riding a small mare with the external genitalia of a stallion. The statue was founded by Robert Wood & Company, whose other works in Washington, D.C. include Major General Nathanael Greene, Major General James B. McPherson and General John A. Rawlins.

The architect selected to design the base is disputed. Historian James M. Goode, author of Outdoor Sculpture of Washington, D.C., cites General Orville E. Babcock of the Corps of Engineers as the architect, while a 1985 report by the National Park Service credits George Edward Harney. The stonework was completed by Jonas H. French of the Cape Ann Granite Company. The base was carved from a single block of granite weighing more than 150 tons. It was the largest single stone ever quarried in the United States at the time.

The original planned site for the statue was present-day McPherson Square. Scott Circle, a tract of land previously known as Jamaica, was renamed in honor of Scott when the monument was installed in 1874 at a total cost of $77,000. Although there was no formal dedication, the park surrounding the site was landscaped with trees and ornamental flowers before the monument was installed. The monument was the first of many memorials to Civil War generals in Washington, D.C.'s traffic circles and squares, although Scott is the only Civil War official to be represented by two statues in the nation's capital. The second statue, by sculptor Launt Thompson, was erected on the grounds of the United States Soldiers' Home in 1873.

=== Reception ===
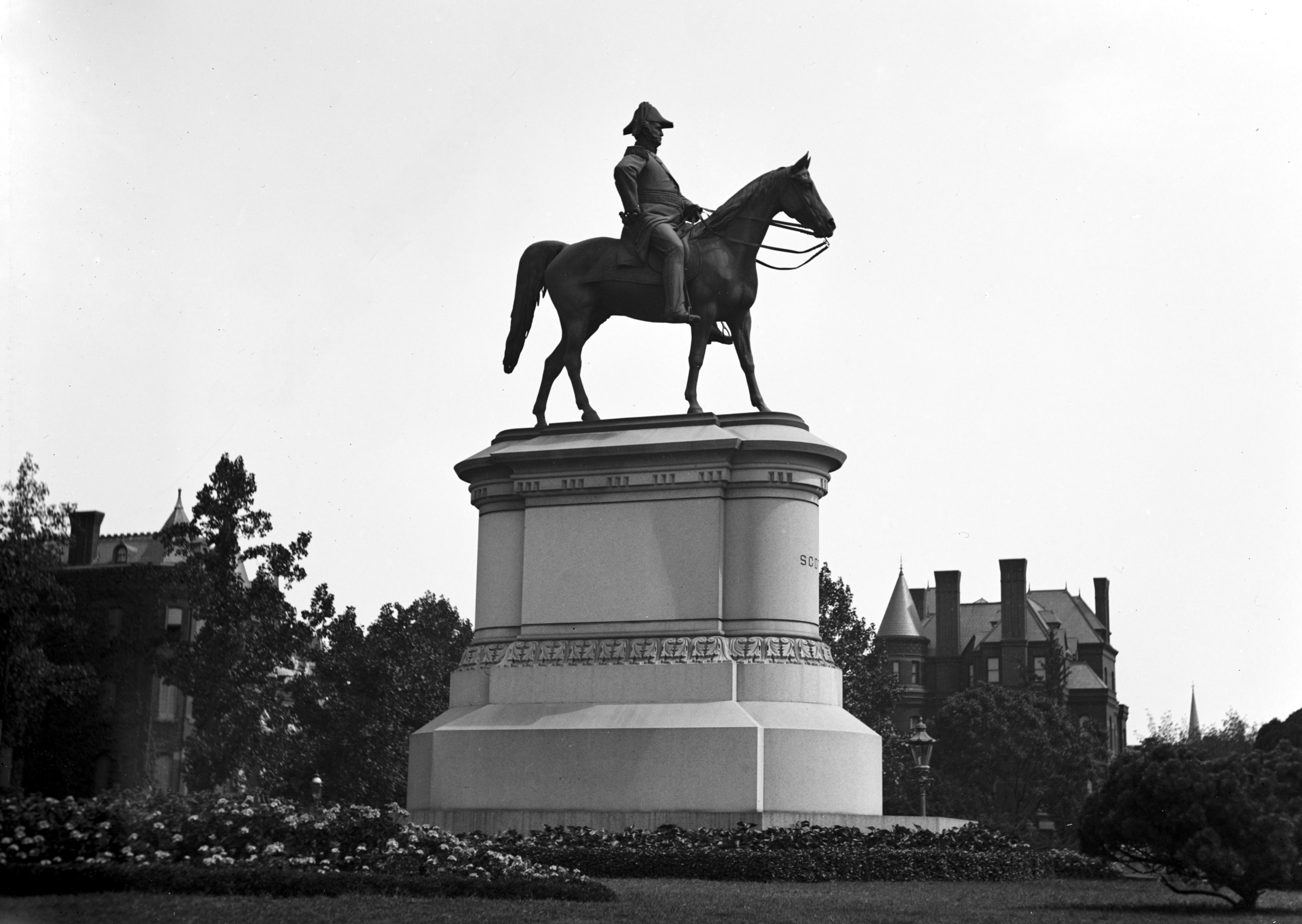
The Scott monument around 1919.

The statue received much criticism after it was installed. Critics said Scott was being portrayed as "too old, too fat, too stiff, too short-legged." He was described as looking like "an old sack of flour" and irritated because his hand was resting on his hip. The horse was ridiculed even more. One reporter said the horse looked like it was "suffering slightly from ringbone lameness and not daring to travel faster than a walk." The proportions of the horse received the greatest amount of criticism, with observers calling it "too light, too delicate, too thin, too timid, and dreadfully proportioned." Upon seeing the monument, General Philip Sheridan reportedly told his wife to never let him be immortalized in such a manner. Kathryn Allamong Jacob, author of Testament to Union: Civil War Monuments in Washington, D.C., considers it one of the worst equestrian monuments in the city, especially when compared to the nearby Major General George Henry Thomas statue, considered one of the city's best. A 2000 article in The Washington Post described it as the city's oddest equestrian statue.

=== Later history ===
The introduction of the monument spurred development around Scott Circle and the immediate area. Soon after the monument was installed, notable individuals including Secretary of the Treasury William Windom and The Washington Post founder Stilson Hutchins built mansions around the circle. The area continued to be a desirable location for wealthy Washingtonians until most of the mansions were demolished in the 1940s. In 1941, the monument was temporarily removed when a four-lane tunnel was built beneath the circle.

The statue is one of eighteen Civil War monuments in Washington, D.C. that were collectively listed on the National Register of Historic Places (NRHP) on September 20, 1978, and the District of Columbia Inventory of Historic Sites on March 3, 1979. The monument and surrounding park are owned and maintained by the National Park Service, a federal agency of the Interior Department.

== Design and location ==
The Scott monument is located in the center of Scott Circle, a traffic circle and park at the convergence of 16th Street, Massachusetts Avenue and Rhode Island Avenue NW, on the border of the Dupont Circle and Logan Circle neighborhoods. Scott Circle is considered the southeastern terminus of Embassy Row with the Embassy of Australia overlooking the circle and statue. The statue faces south down 16th Street towards the White House. The park is flanked by two small, triangular reservations. The Daniel Webster Memorial, listed on the NRHP, is on the west reservation and the Samuel Hahnemann Monument, also listed on the NRHP, is on the east reservation. The statue and park are not intended for pedestrian use as there are no sidewalks on or around the circle. Pedestrians use the side reservations to maneuver around the circle.

The bronze statue is 15 ft (4.6 m) tall and 10 ft (3.0 m) long while the granite base it rests on is 24 ft (7.3 m) wide and 30 ft (9.1 m) long. The inscription "SCOTT" is on the south side of the base. The statue depicts Scott wearing a field uniform of a lieutenant general, including a hat and long jacket with fringed epaulets and decorative sash. He is riding his horse while holding the reins in his left hand. Scott's right hand is holding a pair of field glasses and resting on his hip. His sword is on his left side. The tiered base is adorned with architectural decoration.

== See also ==
- List of equestrian statues in the United States
- List of public art in Washington, D.C., Ward 2
- Outdoor sculpture in Washington, D.C.

== Notes ==
1. In the book Outdoor Sculpture of Washington, D.C., historian James M. Goode cites General Orville E. Babcock as the architect. A 1985 report by the National Park Service names George Edward Harney as the architect.
