= Jonas H. French =

American military officer, politician, and businessman (1829–1903)

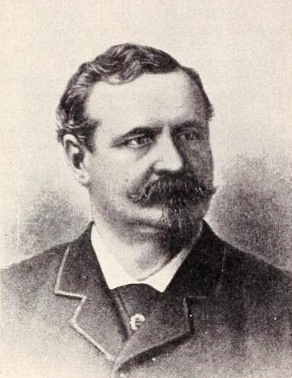

Member of the Massachusetts Senate from the Third Essex District
- In office 1879–1880
- Preceded by: Allan Rogers
- Succeeded by: Francis Norwood

Mayor of New Orleans
- Acting
- In office August 6, 1862 – August 20, 1862
- Preceded by: Godfrey Weitzel
- Succeeded by: Godfrey Weitzel

Personal details
- Born: November 4, 1829 Boston, Massachusetts, U.S.
- Died: February 22, 1903 (aged 73) Boston, Massachusetts, U.S.
- Party: Democratic
- Spouse: Fannie Elizabeth Thompson (died 1882)

Jonas Harrod French (November 4, 1829 – February 22, 1903) was an American army officer who participated in the Union occupation of New Orleans during the American Civil War. After the war, he founded the Cape Ann Granite Company and was a leader in the Massachusetts Democratic Party.

== Early life ==
French was born on November 4, 1829 in Boston. He was educated in the Boston Public Schools and graduated from The English High School in 1845. After graduating, he enlisted in the City Guards and quickly rose to the rank of captain. He served on the military staff of Massachusetts Governor Henry Gardner. In 1861, he became commander of the Ancient and Honorable Artillery Company of Massachusetts.

He married Fannie Elizabeth Thompson, and they had a son, Henry Gardner French. Fannie died on April 3, 1882.

== Civil War ==
In November 1861, French raised soldiers for the Eastern Bay State regiment, later known as the 30th Massachusetts Infantry Regiment, at Camp Chase. In January 1862, he commanded a regiment that sailed from Boston to Ship Island. Upon arriving, he was appointed senior aide-de-camp and inspector-general on the staff of General Benjamin Butler. He was with Butler during the Battle of Forts Jackson and St. Philip and Capture of New Orleans.

Upon occupying New Orleans, French was appointed provost marshal. He is cited as having the brief term of the 22nd mayor of New Orleans (August 6, 1862 – August 20, 1862) as he was acting military mayor while Godfrey Weitzel was called to Baton Rouge on official business. The personnel remained the same as under Godfrey Weitzel's administration. After Weitzel completed his term, he was succeeded by Henry C. Deming. He served under Butler's successor, Nathaniel P. Banks, for some time before resigning and returning to Massachusetts.

== Politics ==
French was a member of the Boston City Council in 1853, 1855, and 1856. He represented the 3rd Essex district in the Massachusetts Senate during the 1879 and 1880 Massachusetts legislatures. From 1880 to 1884, he was the chairman of the Massachusetts Democratic State Committee. He was a delegate to the 1880 and 1888 Democratic National Conventions. He was the Democratic nominee in Massachusetts's 7th congressional district in 1886 and 1890, but lost both times to Republican William Cogswell.

== Business ==
French began his business career as a grocer, but later became a distiller. In 1869, he organized the Cape Ann Granite Company in Gloucester, Massachusetts. The business provided granite for the United States Post Office and Sub-Treasury Building, the base of the Equestrian statue of Winfield Scott in Washington, D.C., and the spandrel walls of the Brooklyn Bridge.

French was a director of the Eastern, New York and New England, and Maine Central Railroads, and president of the Louisville, Evansville, & St. Louis Railroad and Cape Ann Railway. He was a leading proponent of the Eastern's lease to the Boston and Maine Railroad.

In 1873, French was elected a director Maverick National Bank. The bank failed in 1891 and French was charged with embezzlement. The indictment was nol prosed by U.S. Attorney Sherman Hoar in 1893 following the acquittal of bank president Asa P. Potter.

French died suddenly on February 22, 1903 at his winter home in Roxbury.

== See also ==
- List of mayors of New Orleans
