= Daniel Webster Memorial =

Memorial in Washington, D.C., U.S.

- U.S. National Register of Historic Places
- U.S. Historic district – Contributing property
- D.C. Inventory of Historic Sites
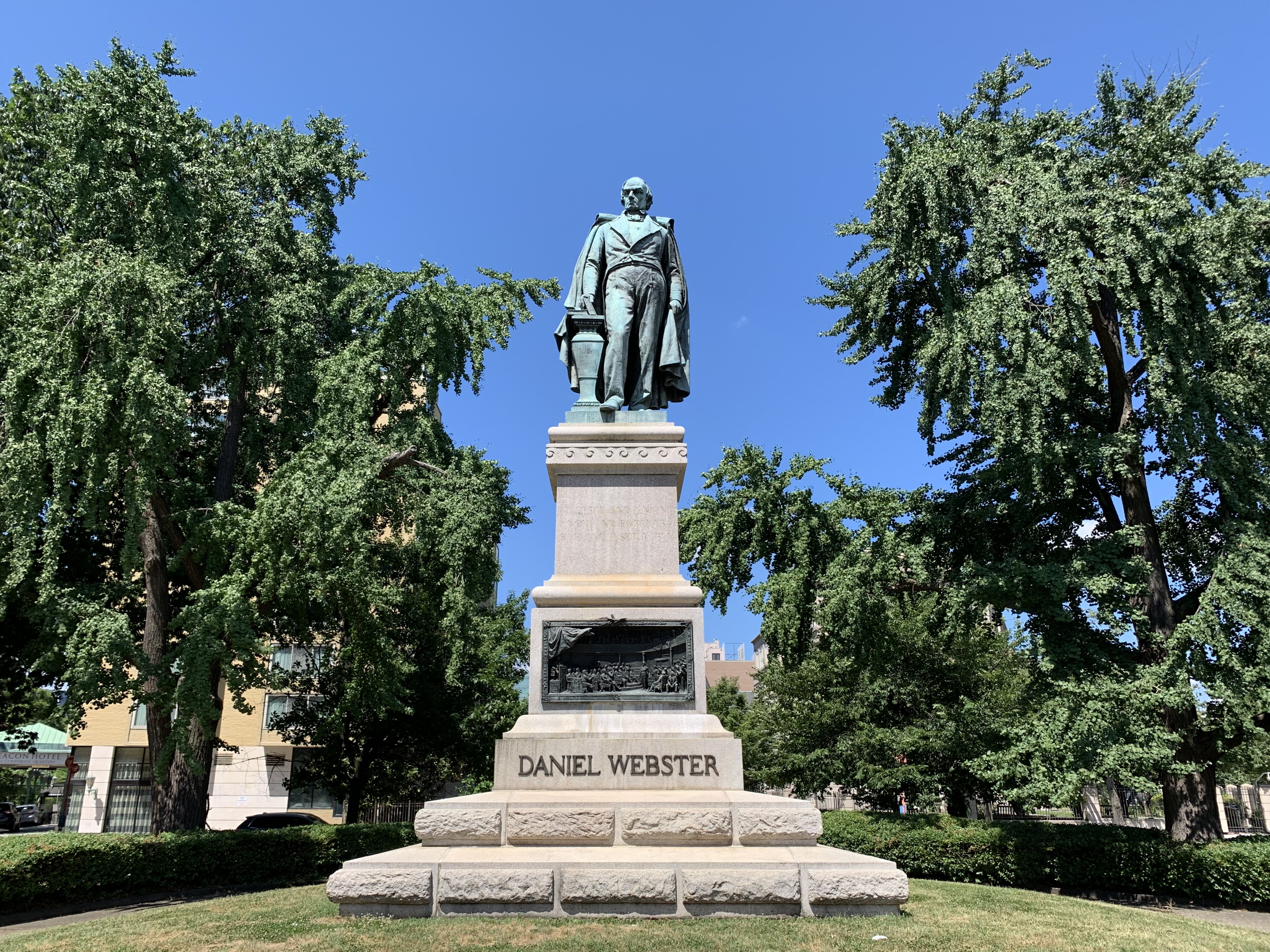
- Daniel Webster Memorial in 2015
- Location: Washington, D.C.
- Coordinates: 38°54′26″N 77°2′14.2″W
- Built: 1900
- Architect: Gaetano Trentanove (sculptor); Unknown (architect); Fonderia Galli (founder)
- Architectural style: Neoclassical
- NRHP reference No.: 07001063

Significant dates
- Added to NRHP: October 12, 2007
- Designated CP: August 25, 1978 (Sixteenth Street Historic District); April 24, 1997 (L'Enfant Plan)
- Designated DCIHS: February 22, 2007

The Daniel Webster Memorial is a monument in Washington, D.C., honoring U.S. statesman and lawyer Daniel Webster. It is located near Webster's former house, beside Scott Circle, at the intersection of Massachusetts Avenue, N Street, and Rhode Island Avenue NW. The person who commissioned the memorial was Stilson Hutchins, founder of The Washington Post, who greatly admired Webster. Congress approved the memorial in 1898 and the dedication ceremony took place in January 1900. Amongst the attendees at the ceremony were President William McKinley and his cabinet, members of Congress, and Supreme Court justices.

The 12-foot tall (3.7 m) bronze statue rests on an 18-foot (5.5 m) granite pedestal on the west side of Scott Circle. The statue depicts Webster as an orator. The pedestal features two bas-reliefs, one depicting the Webster–Hayne debate and the other Webster speaking at the Bunker Hill Monument dedication ceremony. There are inscriptions describing Webster's life and the sculptor's name. The memorial was listed on the National Register of Historic Places (NRHP) and the District of Columbia Inventory of Historic Sites in 2007. It is also a contributing property to the Sixteenth Street Historic District and the L'Enfant Plan, both of which are listed on the NRHP.

== History ==
=== Subject and sculptor ===
Daniel Webster (1782-1852) was a lawyer and politician who served in the House of Representatives and Senate, and served as Secretary of State twice. He was known as a great statesman and orator, which he often demonstrated in the Senate and in front of the Supreme Court. Some of the landmark cases Webster won in the Supreme Court include Dartmouth College v. Woodward, McCulloch v. Maryland, and Gibbons v. Ogden. In total, Webster spent 23 years serving in Congress, and served as Secretary of State under Presidents William Henry Harrison, John Tyler, and Millard Fillmore.

To honor Webster in the nation's capital, it was proposed to build a memorial to him somewhere in the city. Scott Circle, a traffic circle located a few block north of the White House, already had the equestrian statue of Winfield Scott. There were two small lots on each side of the circle, and it was here where the memorial to Webster and the Samuel Hahnemann Monument would be located.

The person responsible for the idea of a memorial was Stilson Hutchins, founder of The Washington Post, who lived near Scott Circle and was a native of New Hampshire like Webster. Hutchins greatly admired Webster and told members of Congress he would pay for a statue to honor the man. Congress approved the commission on July 1, 1898, and allocated $4,000 to build the pedestal. The architect chosen for the memorial is unknown, but the sculptor was Italian-American Gaetano Trentanove, whose other works in the city include the statue of Jacques Marquette in the National Statuary Hall Collection and the Albert Pike Memorial. He attended academies in Florence and Parma, before moving to the U.S. and later becoming a U.S. citizen. The founder for the project was Fonderia Galli, who also worked on the Pike memorial.

=== Dedication ===
The date chosen for the memorial dedication ceremony was January 18, 1900, exactly 118 years since Webster was born. The dedication took place at the Lafayette Square Opera House whilst the unveiling took place at the memorial site. Amongst the dignitaries in attendance were President William McKinley and his cabinet, members of Congress, and Supreme Court justices. The event began with a prayer from William Henry Milburn, a blind clergyman who was Chaplain of the United States Senate at the time. New Hampshire Senator William E. Chandler spoke on behalf of Congress, officially accepting the memorial. Secretary of the Navy John Davis Long accepted the memorial on behalf of the American people. Henry N. Couden, who was serving as Chaplain of the United States House of Representatives, delivered a benediction before the memorial was unveiled by Webster's great-grandon, Jerome Bonaparte, along with Hutchins' wife and a young lady, Katherine Deering.

=== Later history ===
On February 22, 2007, the memorial was added to the District of Columbia Inventory of Historic Sites. It was listed on the National Register of Historic Places (NRHP) on October 12, 2007. The memorial is also designated a contributing property to the Sixteenth Street Historic District, listed on the NRHP on August 25, 1978, and the L'Enfant Plan, listed on April 24, 1997.

== Location and design ==
=== Location ===
The Daniel Webster statue is located on Reservation 62, a small parcel of land on the west side of Scott Circle. On the opposite side of the circle in Reservation 64 is the Samuel Hahnemann Monument. The equestrian statue of Winfield Scott, in Reservation 63, stands in the middle of the circle. The three monuments create a bowtie effect with the layout of Scott Circle. Reservation 62 is at the intersection of N Street, Massachusetts Avenue, and Rhode Island Avenue NW. The statue is facing east towards Scott Circle. The location of the statue is near Webster's former residence at 1603 Massachusetts Avenue NW.

=== Design ===
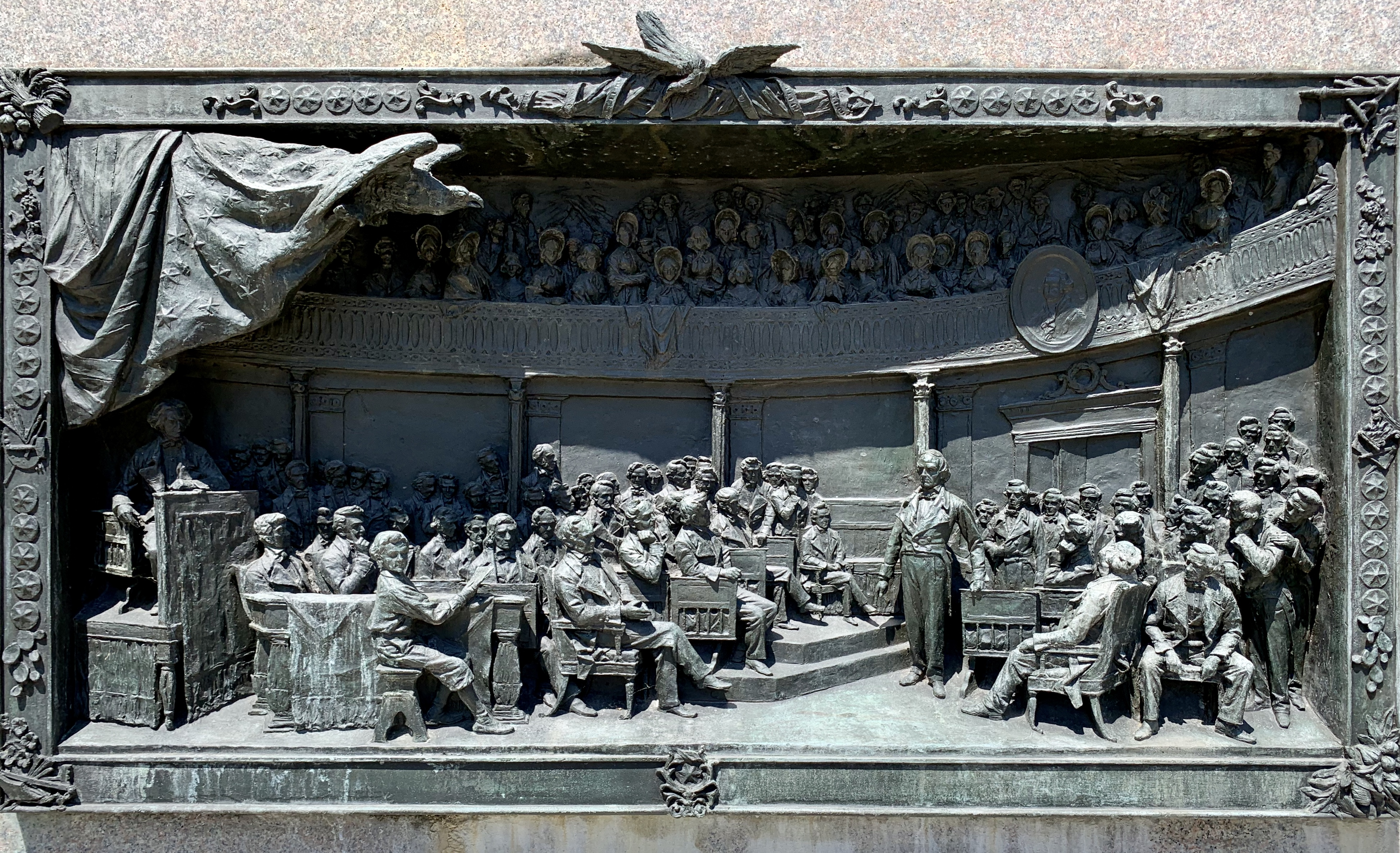
One of two bas-reliefs on the memorial. The one pictured depicts the Webster–Hayne debate.

The bronze statue is approximately 12 feet tall (3.7 m), 4 feet wide (1.2 m), and 3 foot deep (0.9 m). It depicts Webster as an orator and, according to historian James Moore Goode, "The shoulders are thrown back in a defiant manner as if in answer to a challenge." Historian Eve L. Barsoum said his face "portrays an intensity and sternness, indicative of his litigious and oratory skills. Webster's right hand is holding a book, which rests on a stand. His clothing includes a long cape draped around his shoulders featuring epaulets.

The rose granite pedestal is approximately 18 feet tall (5.5 m) and 14 feet (4.3 m) on each side. The memorial's total height is 30 feet and reflects neoclassical architecture. On the pedestal are two bronze bas-reliefs, one on the west side and one on the east side, that portray pivotal moments of Webster's life. The bas-relief on the east side depicts the 1830 Webster–Hayne debate, a debate in the U.S. Senate between Webster and Robert Y. Hayne, and includes over 100 additional people in relief. The second bas-relief depicts Webster delivering a dedication speech from a flag-draped balcony at the Bunker Hill Monument in 1843. There is a quote from the illustrated speeches above each bas-relief.

==== Inscription ====
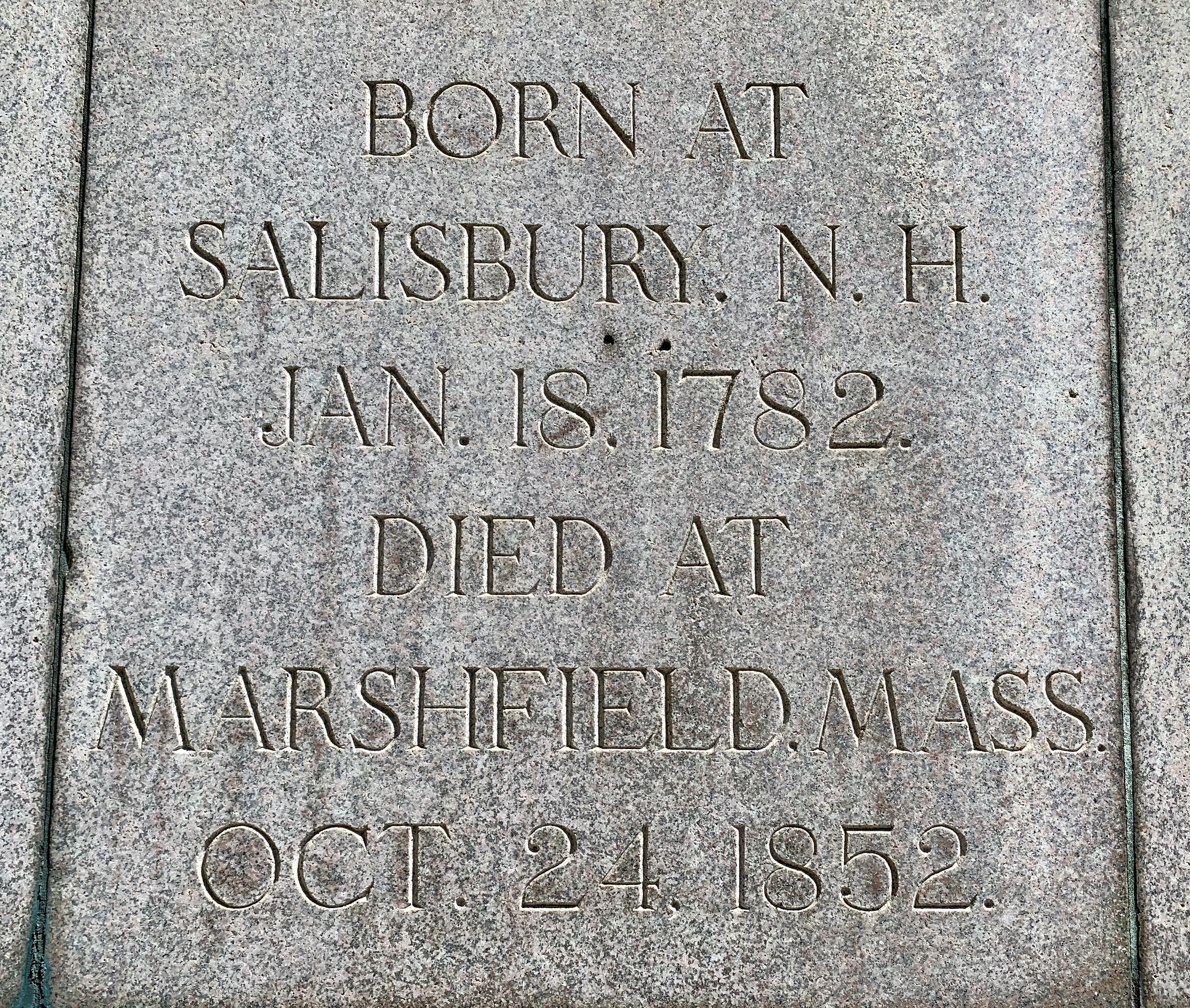
One of the inscriptions on the memorial's pedestal

The inscription reads:
G. Trentanove F. Galli Fuseri, Firenze 1898 Italia
(Front of base:)
DANIEL WEBSTER
LIBERTY AND UNION
NOW AND FOREVER
ONE AND INSEPARABLE
(Proper left bottom:)
BORN AT
SALISBURY, N.H.
JAN 18, 1782
DIED AT
MARSHFIELD MASS
OCT. 24, 1852
(Bottom rear:)
GIVEN BY STILLSON HUTCHINS
A NATIVE OF N.H.
DEDICATED JAN. 18, 1900
(Rear top:)
OUR COUNTRY
OUR WHOLE COUNTRY
AND NOTHING BUT
OUR COUNTRY
(Proper right, bottom:)
EXPOUNDER
AND DEFENDER
OF THE CONSTITUTION

== See also ==
- List of public art in Washington, D.C., Ward 2
- National Register of Historic Places in Washington, D.C.
- Outdoor sculpture in Washington, D.C.
- Statue of Daniel Webster (Boston)
- Statue of Daniel Webster (New York City)
- Statue of Daniel Webster (U.S. Capitol)
