= Jacques Jouvenal =

American sculptor

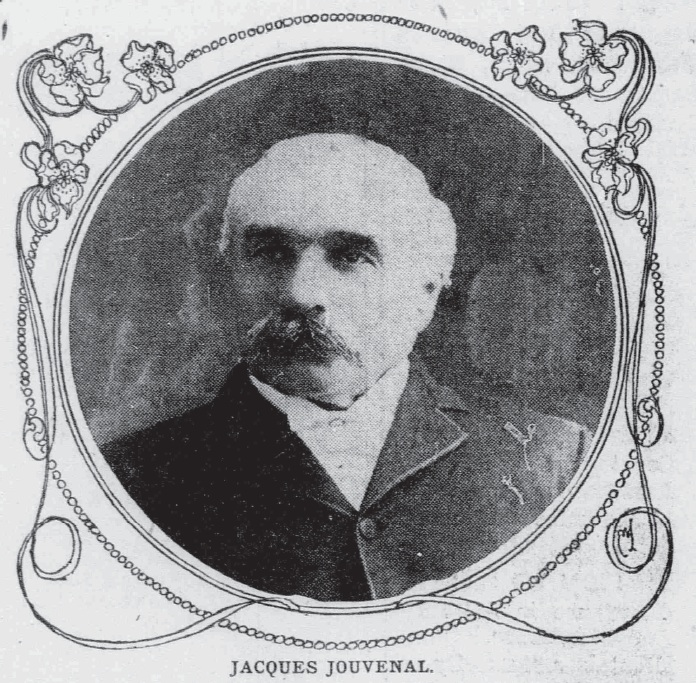
- Jacques Jouvenal about 1905
- Born: March 8, 1829; Pinache, Baden, German Confederation
- Died: March 8, 1905 (aged 76); Washington, D.C., U.S.
- Resting place: Rock Creek Cemetery; Washington, D.C., U.S.
- Known for: Sculpture
- Notable work: Bust of General von Steuben; Benjamin Franklin Statue

Jacques Jouvenal (March 8, 1829 – March 8, 1905) was a German American sculptor. He assisted in the carving of the columns for the United States Capitol, and sculpted many busts of noted Americans.

== Life and career ==
Jouvenal was born in March 1829 in to Francois and Susanna (Giraud) Jouvenal. (Note: Although many sources say that Jouvenal's mother's name was Mary, Jouvenal himself called her Susanna.) His parents were Huguenots who fled religious persecution in France and settled in Pinache (now the town of Wiernsheim) in the state of Baden in the German Confederation. When he was 16 years old, he moved to Stuttgart, capital of the neighboring German state of Württemberg, where he was trained as a sculptor.

Jouvenal emigrated to the United States in June 1853, and married Mary Hauser on August 17, 1853, in New York City. The Jouvenals moved to Washington, D.C., in July 1855, where Jouvenal helped to sculpt the capitals of the columns of the United States Capitol, then undergoing a major expansion. Jouvenal was dismissed when the American Civil War broke out in April 1861.

Jouvenal established himself as a sculptor in the city, and was well known as a portraitist. When the Richmond and Danville Railroad (precursor to the Southern Railway) expanded its headquarters at 13th Street and Pennsylvania Avenue in 1886, it commissioned a statue of Benjamin Franklin to stand over the entrance. Stilson Hutchins, founder and publisher of The Washington Post, purchased the statue and presented it to the city. Although designed by Ernst Plassman and almost identical to his Franklin statue in New York City, it was carved by Jouvenal. Jouvenal founded a stoneyard and sold funeral monuments from a shop at 10th and D Streets NW in the city. In the 1860s and 1870s, he was the pre-eminent sculptor of funeral monuments in the city. In the years just prior to his death, Jouvenal was employed by the Architect of the Capitol, and designed sculpture and architectural details for both the Capitol building and the then-unbuilt State, War, and Navy Building.

Jacques Jouvenal died of unspecified causes on the morning of March 8, 1905, at his home. He was buried in Rock Creek Cemetery in Washington, D.C. Jouvenal was survived by his wife, two sons (Rudolph and Adolph), and four daughters (Caroline, Clara, Emma, and Wilhelmina).

Jouvenal's son, Rudolph, was also a sculptor and stonecutter, and was chosen from a field of 225 stonemasons to carve the capstone for the Washington Monument.

== Works ==
Jouvenal was a prolific sculptor. Among his more notable works are a statue of Benjamin Franklin, and portrait busts of Alexander Hamilton, Martin Van Buren, and Daniel Webster. His bust of Aaron Burr (1893) is still held by the United States Senate. His marble bust of General von Steuben, finished in 1870, is one of the earliest monuments to the hero of the American Revolutionary War, and stands on the grounds of the German Embassy in Washington, D.C.

Jouvenal also sculpted many funeral memorials and monuments. These include the Force Memorial at Rock Creek Cemetery and many memorials at Prospect Hill Cemetery, both in Washington, D.C.

== Gallery ==
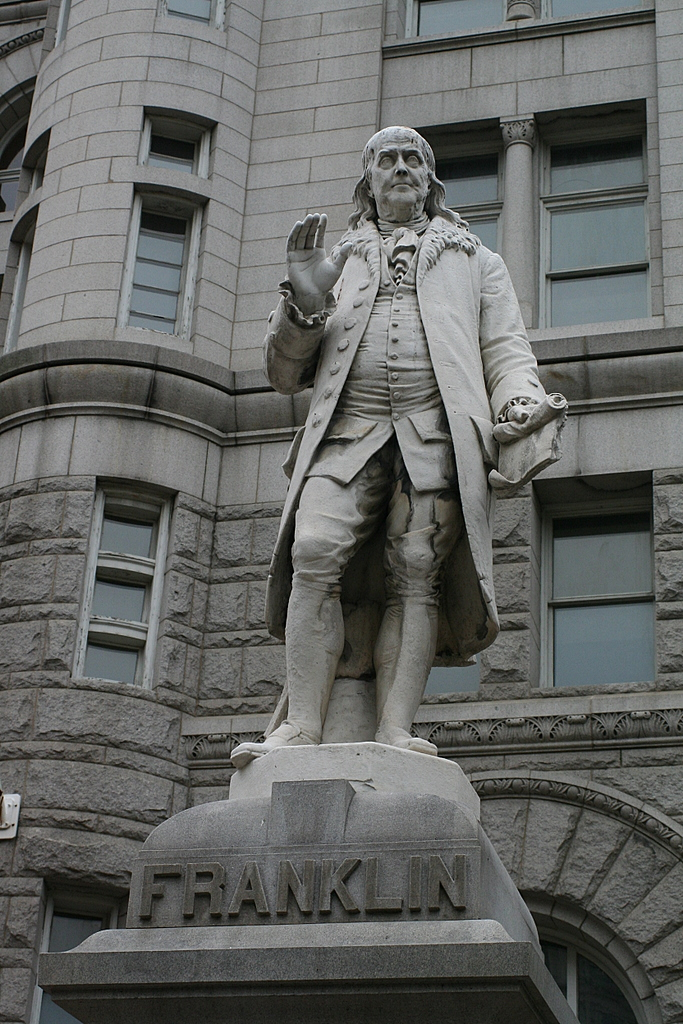
Benjamin Franklin (1889), Old Post Office Pavilion entrance, Pennsylvania Avenue NW, Washington, D.C.

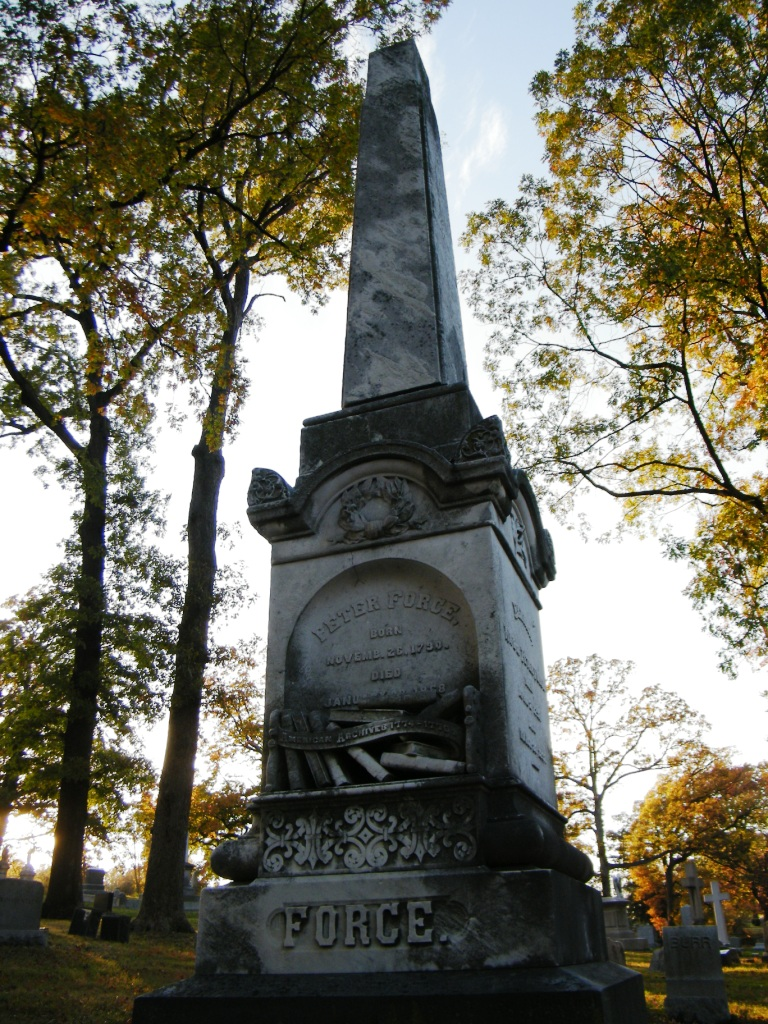
Force Memorial (1868), Rock Creek Cemetery, Washington, D.C.

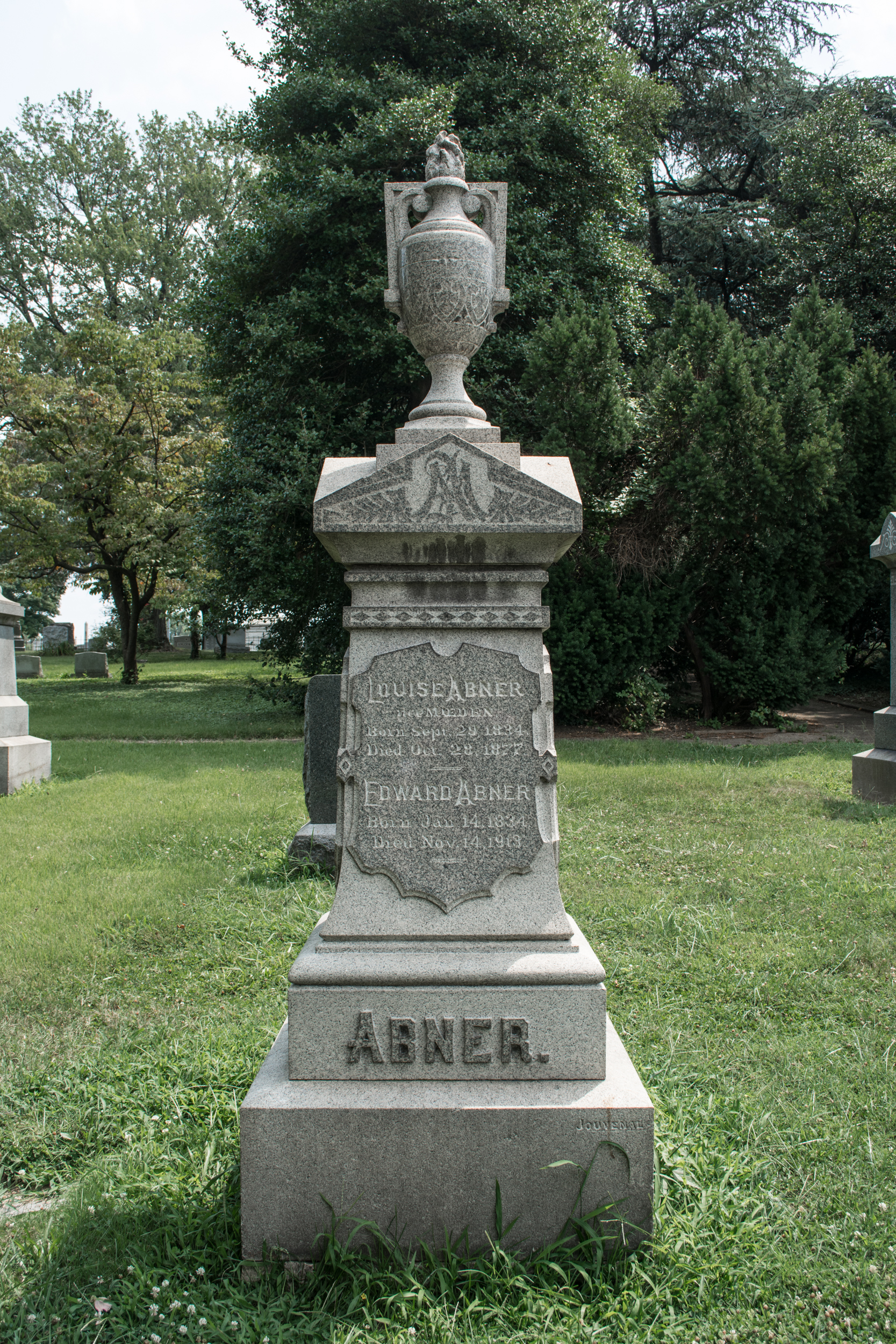
Edward Abner funerary memorial (1877), Prospect Hill Cemetery, Washington, D.C.

== Bibliography ==
- Fairman, Charles E. (1913). Works of Art in the United States Capitol Building. S.Doc.169. 63d Cong., 1st sess. Washington, D.C.: Government Printing Office.
- Historic Preservation Review Board (2006). Decision of the District of Columbia Historic Preservation Review Board in Historic Landmark Designation Case No. 04-13: Prospect Hill Cemetery, 2201 North Capitol Street NE (Square 3505, Lot 801) (PDF). Washington, D.C.
- Pohlsander, Hans A. (2010). German Monuments in the Americas: Bonds Across the Atlantic. New York: Peter Lang. ISBN 9783034301381.
- Reed, Robert C. (1980). Old Washington, D.C., in Early Photographs, 1846-1932. New York: Dover Publications. ISBN 0486238695.
