= Samuel Hahnemann Monument =

Memorial by Charles Henry Niehaus in Washington, D.C., U.S.

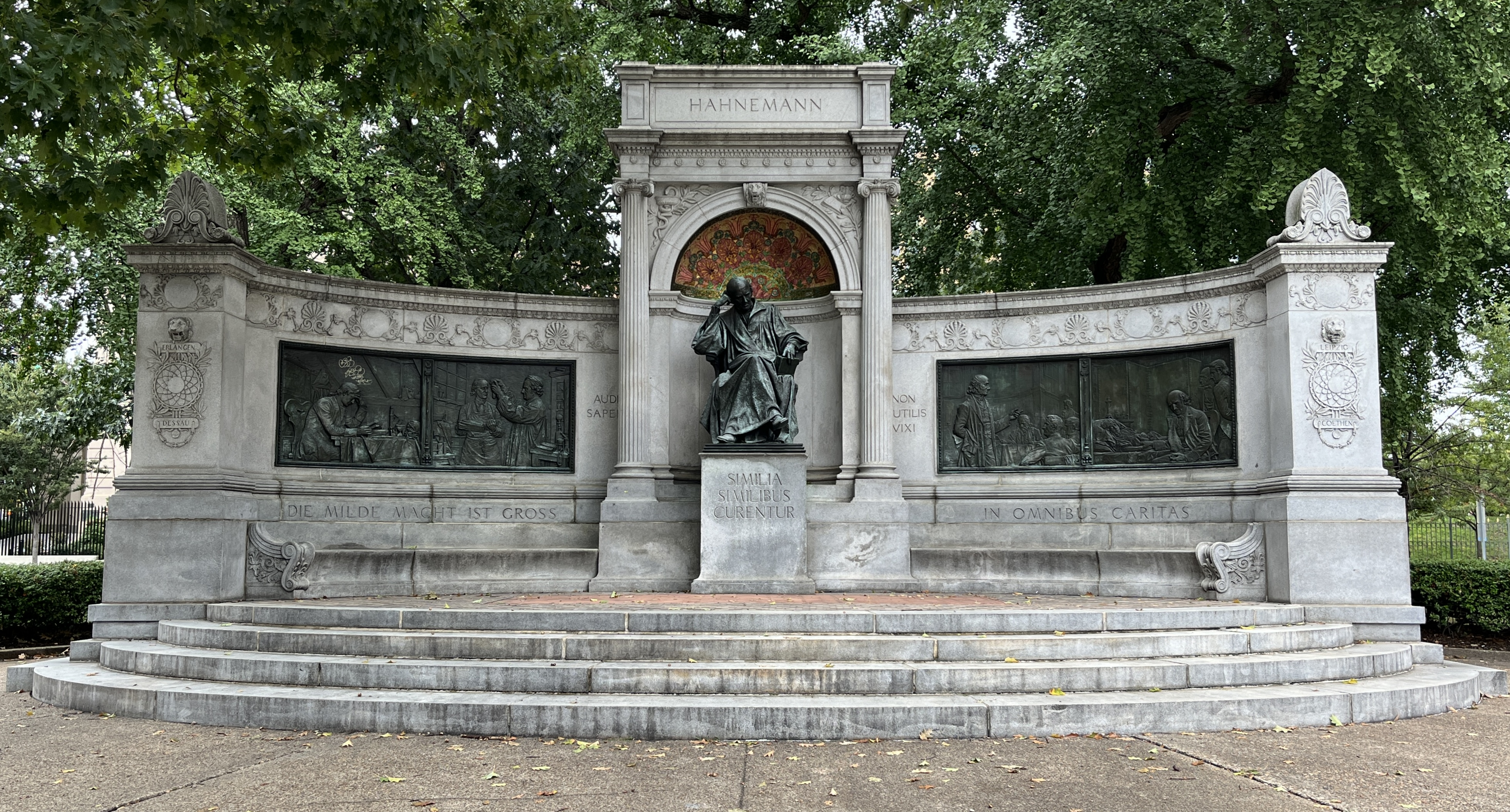
- Monument in 2024
- Interactive map of Samuel Hahnemann Monument
- Location: Reservation 64, Scott Circle, Washington, D.C., United States
- Coordinates: 38.907256°N 77.035725°W
- Samuel Hahnemann Monument
- U.S. National Register of Historic Places
- NRHP reference No.: 07001055
- Added to NRHP: October 11, 2007
- Designer: Charles Henry Niehaus (sculptor); Julius F. Harder (architect); Gorham Manufacturing Company (founder); Maine & New Hampshire Granite Company (contractor)
- Material: Bronze (sculpture, reliefs); Marble (base); Granite (exedra); Ceramic (mosaic)
- Length: 2.5 feet (0.76 m)
- Width: 3 feet (0.91 m)
- Height: 6 feet (1.8 m)
- Opening date: June 21, 1900
- Dedicated to: Samuel Hahnemann

The Samuel Hahnemann Monument, also known as Dr. Samuel Hahnemann, is a public artwork dedicated to German physician Samuel Hahnemann, the founder of homeopathy. It is located on the east side of Scott Circle, a traffic circle in the northwest quadrant of Washington, D.C. The Classical Revival monument consists of an exedra designed by architect Julius Harder and a statue sculpted by Charles Henry Niehaus, whose works include the John Paul Jones Memorial in Washington, D.C., and several statues in the National Statuary Hall Collection. The monument is significant because Hahnemann is the first foreigner not associated with the American Revolution to be honored with a sculpture in Washington, D.C.

The monument was dedicated in 1900 following years of fundraising efforts by the American Institute of Homeopathy. Among the thousands of attendees at the dedication ceremony were prominent citizens including President William McKinley, Attorney General John W. Griggs, and General John Moulder Wilson. The monument was rededicated in 2000 and a restoration process was completed in 2011. It was listed on the National Register of Historic Places in 2007. The monument and surrounding lot are owned and maintained by the National Park Service, a federal agency of the Interior Department.

== History ==
=== Background ===
Samuel Hahnemann (1755–1843) was a German physician who created homeopathy, an alternative medicine system that is considered a pseudoscience. He studied chemistry and medicine at the University of Erlangen-Nuremberg, earning a medical degree in 1779. He was then appointed Surgeon-in-Chief at a hospital in Dresden and later served as superintendent of an insane asylum in Georgenthal. While serving on the faculty at Leipzig University, Hahnemann became disillusioned with standard medical procedures of the time, including over drugging and bleeding. He pursued what he considered "natural laws" of medicine, opposing allopathy and developed the "laws of similars" (similia similibus curantur, meaning like is cured by like). His unorthodox views were controversial at the time, but Hahnemann continued to pursue his homeopathic studies and published several works, including The Organon of the Healing Art (1810), Materia Medica Pura (1811–1821), and The Chronic Diseases, Their Peculiar Nature and Their Homeopathic Cure (1828). He is considered the greatest influence on the practice of homeopathy, which was very influential in the late 19th and early 20th centuries.

A monument honoring Hahnemann was first proposed in 1881 by physician James H. McClelland at a meeting of the Homeopathic Medical Society. It wasn't until June 1892 at the 45th Session of the American Institute of Homeopathy (AIH) that the organization agreed to undertake the project. Members of the nation's homeopathic community began raising funds, including the largest single donation of $4,510 by physician Nancy T. Williams. The AIH was assisted in its endeavor by the National Sculpture Society, which formed a committee to select an artist and design. The committee consisted of sculptors George Edwin Bissell, Daniel Chester French, and Olin Levi Warner, and architects Thomas Hastings and Russell Sturgis. A design competition was held with 25 models submitted. They were displayed at the American Academy of the Fine Arts in New York City, the first time a public exhibition of competition models was held in the country. The committee unanimously selected the model submitted by Charles Henry Niehaus (1855–1935).

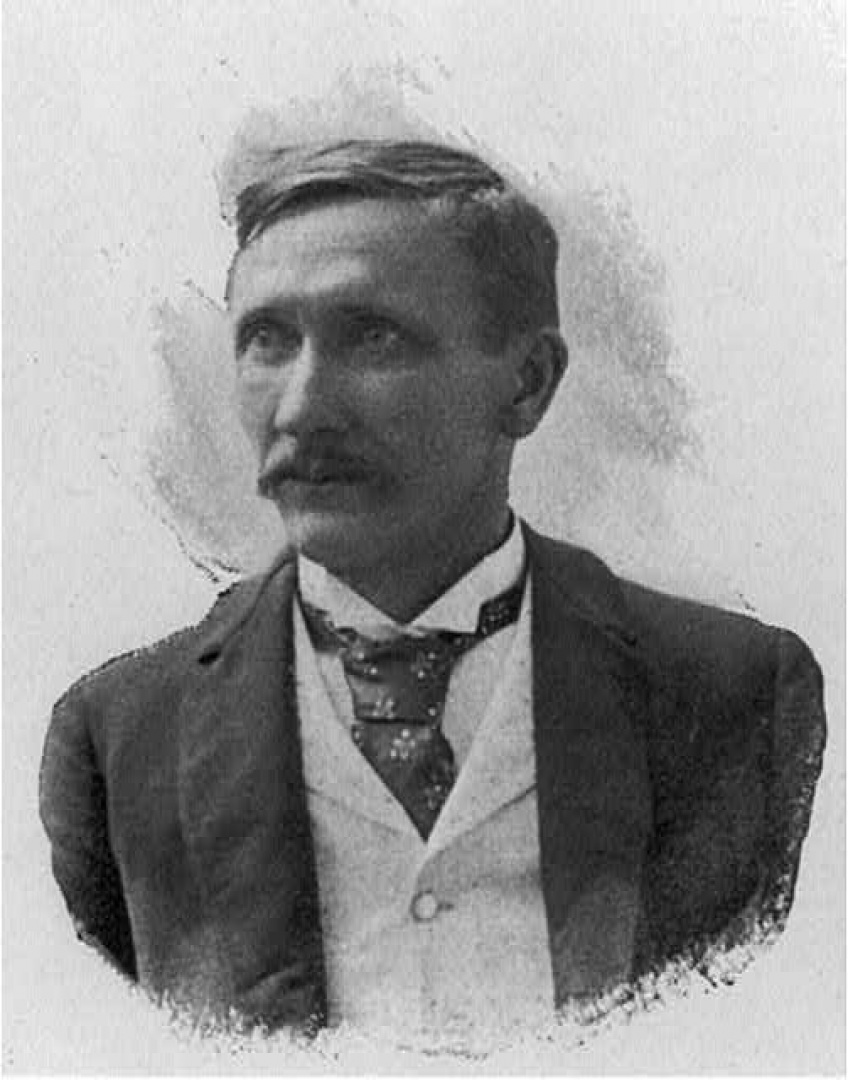
Sculptor Charles Henry Niehaus in 1896

Niehaus was a German-American from Ohio who attended the Royal Academy in Munich. In 1881, the Ohio state government commissioned him to create a statue of the recently assassinated President James A. Garfield. He moved to New York City in 1887 and opened a studio where his works included the pediments at the Appellate Division Courthouse of New York State and the doors of Trinity Church. Niehaus was best known for his portraiture work, including eight statues for the National Statuary Hall Collection in the United States Capitol and two works for the Thomas Jefferson Building's Main Reading Room. His statue of John Paul Jones in Washington, D.C., is listed on the National Register of Historic Places (NRHP). Niehaus created Hahnemann's likeness by using a bust sculpted by David d'Angers that is now housed in the Saint Jacques Hospital in Paris.

While funds were being raised for the monument, permission to install the structure in Washington, D.C., was a difficult and long process. Hahnemann was not an American and had never visited the country. Supporters of the monument lobbied members of Congress to support its erection, but President Grover Cleveland refused to sign the agreement. After the election of President William McKinley, supporters renewed their efforts and eventually won the support of many congressional members and the president. But in 1899, a congressional vote to authorize the monument being placed in Washington, D.C., failed. Members such as Representative L. Irving Handy of Delaware argued that only individuals who had distinguished careers in the military or civil branches of the national government should be honored in the city. Supporters finally won approval of Congress on January 31, 1900, when members voted to approve the monument's placement and appropriate $4,000 for its foundation. Hahnemann became the first foreigner not associated with the American Revolution to be honored with a sculpture in Washington, D.C. The site selected for the monument was chosen by a committee created by Congress. The committee included McClelland, who first proposed the monument, Senator George P. Wetmore and General John Moulder Wilson. The committee chose a site on the east side of Scott Circle "by reason of its abundant opportunities to display to the best advantage the delicate lines which are features of the artist's work." The architect chosen to design the monument was Julius Harder of the firm Israel and Harder. The statue was founded by the Gorham Manufacturing Company and the contractor was the Maine & New Hampshire Granite Company. The total cost of the monument and its installation was around $75,000.

=== Dedication ===
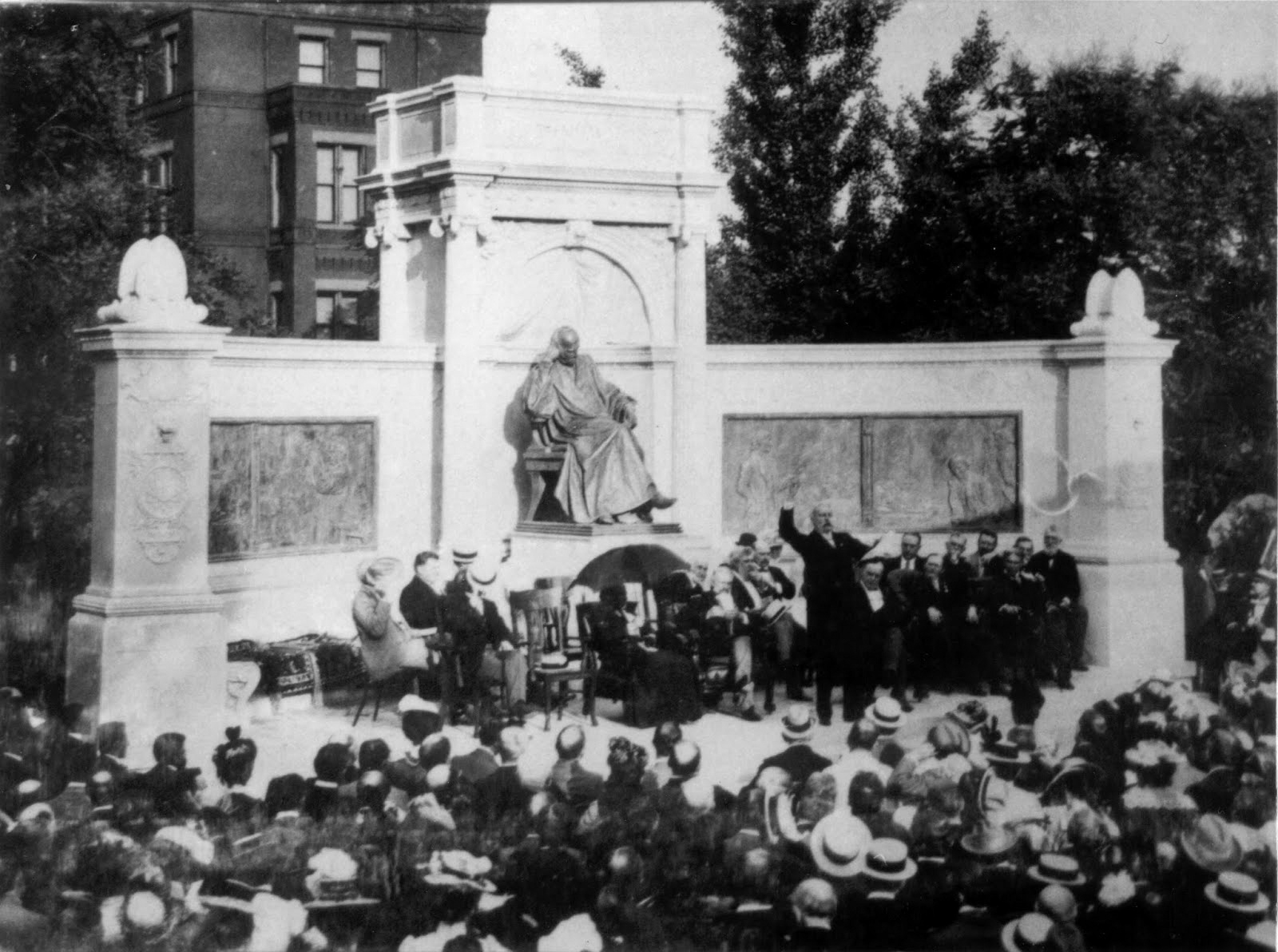
The monument's dedication in 1900

The dedication ceremony took place on June 21, 1900, during an AIH convention. Thousands of people, including hundreds of medical professionals, attended the elaborate ceremony at Scott Circle. In front of the monument were chairs for distinguished guests, including President McKinley and his wife, Ida, both supporters of homeopathy, Attorney General John W. Griggs, General Wilson, and District Commissioner Henry Brown Floyd MacFarland. Temporary scaffolding, adorned with flags and bunting, was built to shield these guests from the sun. When the president arrived, the Marine Band played "Hail to the Chief".

Physician James Bayard Gregg Custis of Washington, D.C., presided over the event. His remarks included: "This monument is erected in the hope that from it, as a center, truth may be spread which will result in the lessening of suffering and the increased usefulness of mankind." The invocation was provided by Presbyterian minister Benjamin Franklin Bittinger. McClelland, who served as chairman of the monument committee, gave a brief address and formally presented the monument to the AIH. The monument was then unveiled as the Marine Band played "My Country, 'Tis of Thee". The president of the AIH, physician Charles E. Walton of Cincinnati, then presented the monument to the government on behalf of the organization's members. He said, "Their labors make it possible, in this memorable year 1900, which marks on the dial of time the dividing point of centuries, to rear in our nation's capital this beautiful monument commemorating at once the genius of Samuel Hahnemann and the loyalty of his followers." An ode by physician William Tod Helmuth of New York was read followed by acceptance of the monument by government representative Colonel Theodore A. Bingham. He said, "It is with great pleasure that I have the honor, as the government's officer in charge of public buildings and grounds in the District of Columbia, to accept this monument on behalf of the government, and I assure you that every care will be taken for its preservation."

The Marine Band then played "The Star-Spangled Banner" followed by an address by Attorney General Griggs. He stated: "In the center of this park stands the statue of a great warrior, General Scott; on the other side is a statue of a great statesman and orator, Daniel Webster. Here on this side, with great appropriateness, has been placed the statue of a scientist, a reformer, a good physician. There is, said he, but one test of worthiness, and that is that a man shall have wrought in unselfishness, in the interests of his country, of humanity and the world. It was the merit of Dr. Hahnemann, he said, that he exposed fallacy, uncovered truth and uncovered errors." The ceremony concluded with the crowd giving three cheers for the president followed by the band playing music. Following the ceremony, the president invited around 1,000 guests to the White House and received them in the state rooms.

=== Later history ===
On June 21, 2000, one hundred years after the original dedication, the AIH hosted "Homeopathy 2000: Rededication and Celebration in Washington, D.C." A rededication ceremony organized by homeopathic societies and other organizations was held with an Armed Forces Color Guard and music provided by the Marine Band Brass Quintet. It was during this ceremony that attendees realized the monument was in need of repair, including the crumbling mosaic above the statue. Physician Sandra M. Chase of the American Institute of Homeopathy Hahnemann Monument Preservation Committee organized a fundraising drive called the Hahnemann Monument Restoration Project. During the next few years, AIH members and the public raised over $30,000 for repairs. Working with the National Park Service (NPS), the committee hired conservator Judy Jacob to oversee the restoration. The process included the statue being evaluated and cleaned, the granite edifice being cleaned, the fountain basin and pedestal on the back of the monument being restored, and the brick in the surrounding plaza being relayed and leveled. A missing oak tree was also replaced and an informal pathway was covered. The completion of the restoration project was marked by an event at the monument site on September 16, 2011, with representatives from the NPS and AIH in attendance.

The monument was added to the District of Columbia Inventory of Historic Sites on February 22, 2007, and the NRHP on October 11, 2007. It is also designated a contributing property to the Sixteenth Street Historic District, listed on the NRHP in 1978. The monument and surrounding lot are owned and maintained by the NPS, a federal agency of the Interior Department.

== Design and location ==
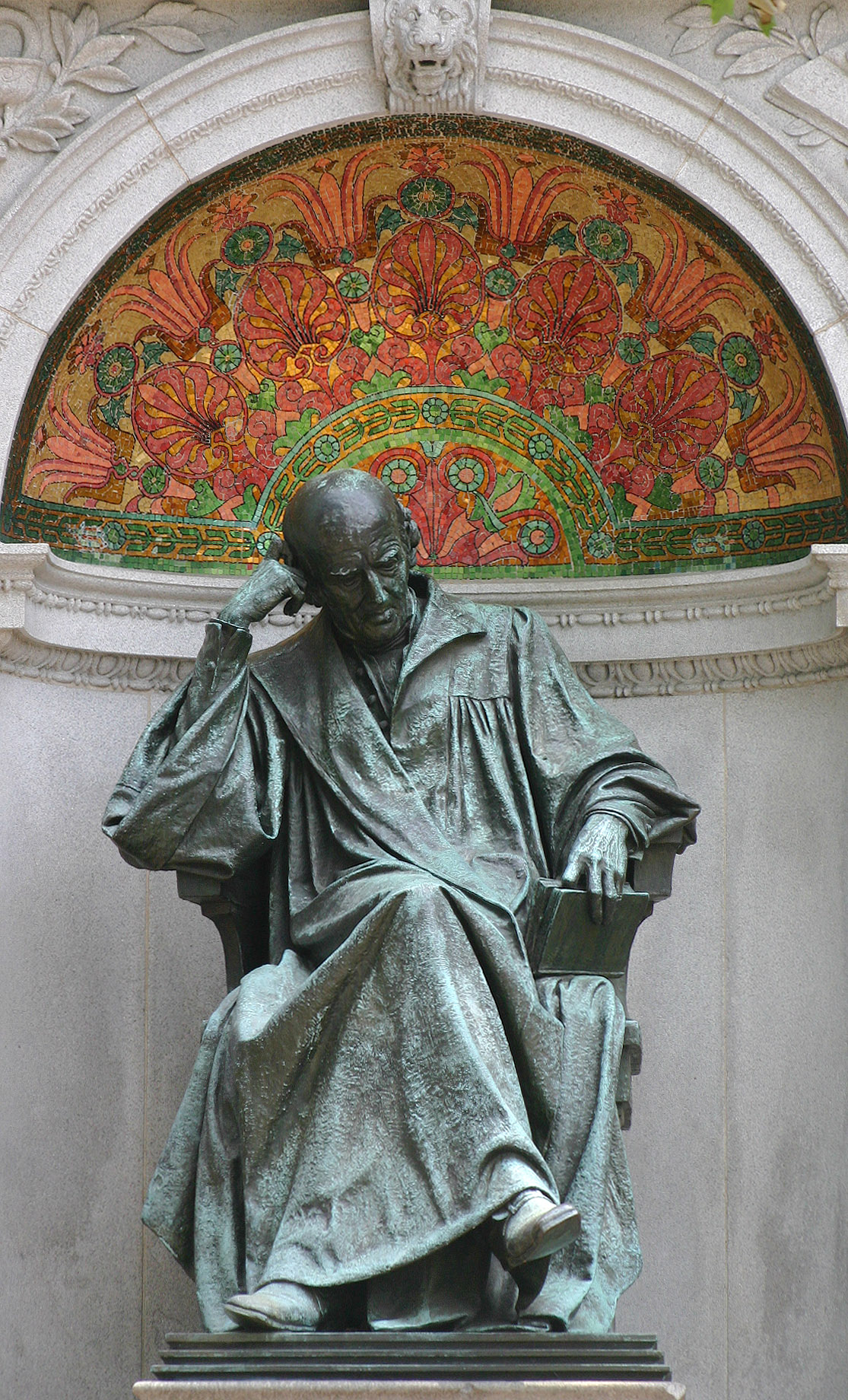
The Hahnemann statue.

The Samuel Hahnemann Monument is located on Reservation 64, a small triangular lot on the east side of Scott Circle between Corregidor Street, Massachusetts Avenue, and Rhode Island Avenue NW. The monument faces west towards the traffic circle and the Brevet Lt. General Winfield Scott equestrian statue. On the opposite side of the circle is the Daniel Webster Memorial, also listed on the NRHP.

The Classical Revival monument consists of an exedra with a seated statue of Hahnemann on a central niche. The statue measures 6 ft (1.8 m) tall, 2.5 ft (0.76 m) wide, and 3 ft (0.91 m) long. He is wearing long robes and has his right leg crossed over his left leg. Hahnemann's right arm is resting on the arm of the chair as his head rests against his right hand. His left arm is resting on the left arm of the chair and his left hand is holding a book. Hahnemann is depicted as bald and seeming to concentrate while looking down to his left. Above Hahnemann on the niche is a decorative ceramic mosaic designed in the Art Nouveau style and keystone lion head. On either side of the lion head are stone reliefs. The right relief is a snake wrapped around a chalice and the left relief is an open book and chemist's bowl. The niche is flanked by columns and a top panel bears the inscription "HAHNEMANN". Below the statue is a Latin inscription, "SIMILIA / SIMILIBUS / CURENTUR", which translates "Likes Are Cured By Like." On either side of the niche are a pair of bronze reliefs sculpted by Niehaus, each measuring 4 ft (1.2 m) high and 1 ft (0.30 m) long. The left reliefs depict Hahnemann as a student and as a chemist. The German inscription "DIE MILDE MACHT IST GROSS", meaning "Gentle Power is Great", is below the left reliefs. The right reliefs depict Hahnemann as a teacher and as a physician. The Latin inscription "IN OMNIBUS CARITAS", meaning "In All Things, Charity", is below the right reliefs. A shell motif is located above the reliefs on each side. On each end of the exedra is a post adorned with a shield and lion head. A large shell is on the top of each of these posts. Four semi-circular steps lead to the exedra. The exedra is 25 ft (7.6 m) tall, 36 ft (11 m) long, and 24 ft (7.3 m) wide. On the back of the exedra is a fountain basin with a bird-like fountain spout and a relief of two nude figures kneeling back to back.

Inscriptions on the monument include the following:

- FEC '96 Gorham MFG Co / Founders
- C H Niehaus (first left bronze relief)
- C.H. Niehaus 1896 (second left bronze relief)
- CH Niehaus 96 (first right bronze relief)
- CH Niehaus/FEC (second right bronze relief)
- HAHNEMANN (above niche)
- SIMILIA / SIMILIBUS / CURENTUR (base of figure)
- AUDE SAPERE (left side of figure)
- NON INUTILIS VIXI (right side of figure)
- IN OMNIBUS CARITAS (below reliefs, right side)
- DIE MILDE MACHT IST GROSS (below reliefs, left side)
- ERLANGEN / DESSAU (left end post)
- COETHEN / LEIPZIG (right end post)
- MCM / CHRISTIAN FRIEDRICH SAMUEL HAHNEMANN / DOCTOR IN MEDICINE / HOFRATH / LEADER OF THE GREAT / MEDICAL REFORMATION / OF THE NINETEENTH / CENTURY / FOUNDER OF THE / * * HOMEOPATHIC SCHOOL (back of exedra, center panel)
- PARIS JULY 2 1843 (back of exedra, right panel)
- MEISSEN APRIL 11, 1755 (back of exedra, left panel)

== See also ==
- List of public art in Washington, D.C., Ward 2
- National Register of Historic Places listings in Washington, D.C.
- Outdoor sculpture in Washington, D.C.
