= Statue of Benjamin Franklin (Washington, D.C.) =

Marble statue in Washington, D.C.

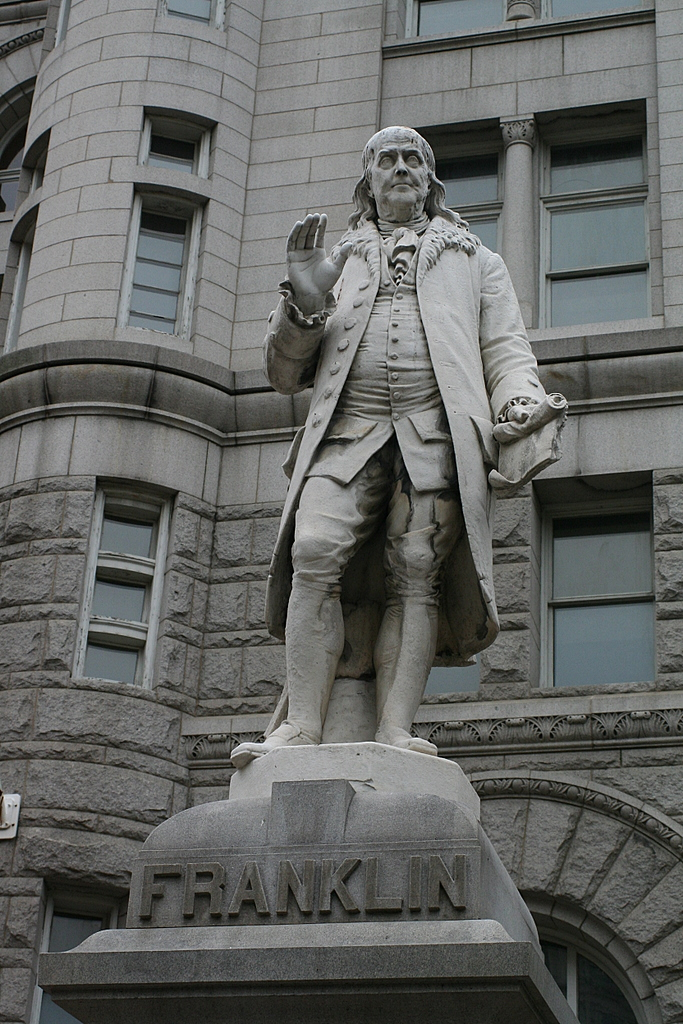
- The statue in 2007
- Artist: Jacques Jouvenal (sculptor, based on Ernst Plassmann's design); J. F. Manning (architect)
- Year: 1889
- Type: Carrara marble
- Dimensions: 2.4 m (8 ft)
- Owner: National Park Service
- Statue of Benjamin Franklin
- U.S. National Register of Historic Places
- U.S. Historic district – Contributing property
- D.C. Inventory of Historic Sites
- Location: 12th Street and Pennsylvania Avenue NW Washington, D.C.
- Coordinates: 38°53′40″N 77°1′40″W
- Part of: American Revolution Statuary; L'Enfant Plan; Pennsylvania Avenue National Historic Site
- NRHP reference No.: 78000256

Significant dates
- Added to NRHP: July 14, 1978
- Designated DCIHS: March 3, 1979

The outdoor statue of Benjamin Franklin in Washington, D.C., is located near the intersection of 12th Street and Pennsylvania Avenue NW, in front of the Old Post Office. The statue was a gift from Stilson Hutchins, founder of The Washington Post, who wanted to display his and the newspaper's stature in the city. The designer, Ernst Plassmann, and sculptor, Jacques Jouvenal, were both German-American artists. The architect of the memorial was J. F. Manning.

The statue was unveiled in 1889 after several years of bureaucratic red tape. There was no public celebration at the dedication, due to Hutchins' desire for the event to be small and intimate. The statue was originally sited at the intersection of 10th Street, D Street, and Pennsylvania Avenue NW. During the 1960s and 1970s, many changes were made to Pennsylvania Avenue, including relocating the statue. The site chosen, in front of the Old Post Office, was because Franklin, in addition to being a statesman, diplomat, and a Founding Father, served as the country's first Postmaster General.

The statue is one of fourteen American Revolution statues in Washington, D.C., that were collectively listed on the National Register of Historic Places (NRHP). The statue is also a contributing property to the Pennsylvania Avenue National Historic Site and the L'Enfant Plan, both listed on the NRHP. The statue is made of Carrara marble and the pedestal is Quincy granite. There are several inscriptions on the statue and pedestal, and a multi-colored brick inlay surrounds it.

== Location and design ==
The statue of Benjamin Franklin is located in front of the Old Post Office at the intersection of 12th Street and Pennsylvania Avenue NW in Washington, D.C. It was originally sited two blocks east across the street from The Washington Post offices but was moved to its present location in 1980, based on the design plan of the city's Pennsylvania Development Corporation. The statue is made of Carrara marble and is approximately 8 feet tall (2.4 m). The base is Quincy granite and measures 5.5 feet wide (1.7 m). The pedestal and statue are on a raised platform made of granite. When the statue was moved in 1982, Aleksandra Kasuba was chosen to design the platform. In addition to the platform, she designed a multicolor granite and brick pavement surrounding the statue that was meant to recall the Old Post Office interior. The base and platform measures 11-feet tall (3.4 m).

The full-length statue of Franklin depicts him as a diplomat in the court of Louis XVI when the U.S. signed its first treaty with a foreign power. His right arm is raised, and he is holding papers or diplomatic documents with his left hand. Behind his right foot are three books, two closed and one open.

Just under the statue is the inscription:
FRANKLIN

Below that, each side of the base is inscribed with one word describing Franklin:
PRINTER
PHILANTHROPIST
PATRIOT
PHILOSOPHER.

On the second level of the base is inscribed:
PRESENTED TO THE NATIONAL CAPITAL/ BY /STILSON HUTCHINS.

A bronze plaque is on the third level of the base. Its inscription is:
ERECTED JANUARY 17TH, 1889

ERNST PLASSMAN, DESIGNER
JACQUES JOUVENAL, SCULPTOR
J. F. MANNING, DESIGNER OF PEDESTAL

COMMISSIONERS OF DISTRICT OF COLUMBIA
W. B. WEBB, S .E. WHEATLEY, C. W. RAYMOND

== History ==
=== Production and installation ===
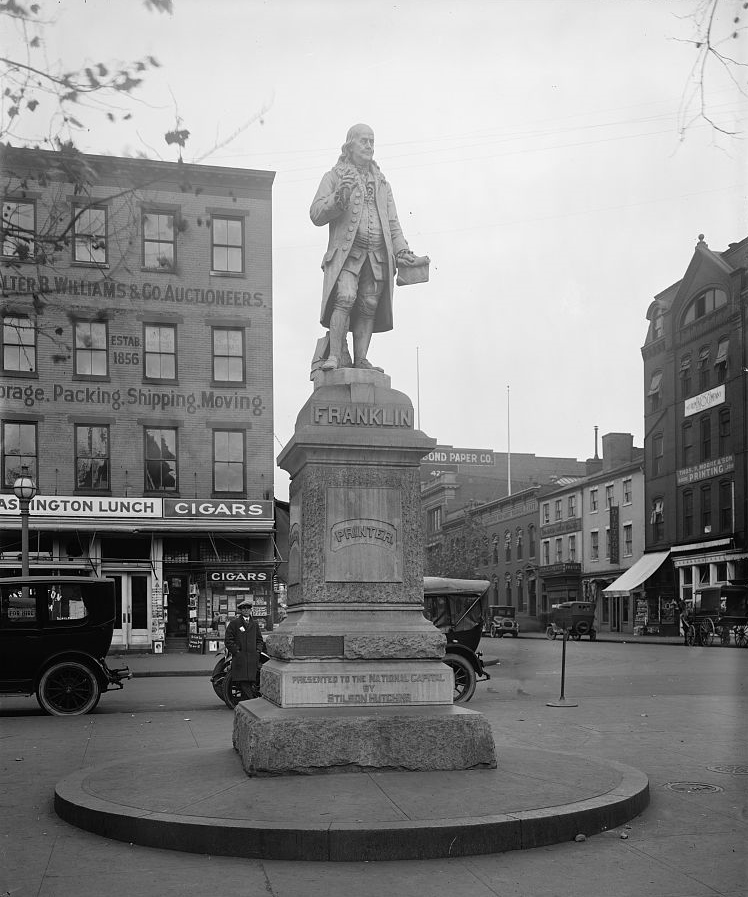
The statue at its original location

Benjamin Franklin, one of America's Founding Fathers and a signer of its Declaration of Independence, was a well-known 18th-century intellectual, scientist, statesman, author, and diplomat. Around 100 years after Franklin's birth, Stilson Hutchins, founder of The Washington Post, aimed to make the surrounding area of his newspaper's building a prime example of his contributions and stature to the city. One of his contributions was to erect a statue honoring Franklin in a small lot at 10th Street, D Street, and Pennsylvania Avenue NW, directly across from The Post building. It took several years before the statue came to fruition. After an Act of Congress was approved on July 19, 1888, local government officials were to find a location for the statue. Since Stilson was paying for the statue, officials chose the lot near his newspaper's building.

Ernst Plassmann was a German-American sculptor who designed the statue of Franklin, partially based on earlier works he had made. The sculptor chosen for the piece, Jacques Jouvenal, was also born in Germany and lived in Washington, D.C., from 1855 until his death in 1905. Jouvenal had operated a statuary workshop at 941 D Street NW, the site where The Post building would be located years later and the current site of the J. Edgar Hoover Building.

By the time the statue was finally installed, Hutchins had retired and dedicated the piece to Washington, D.C., as a symbol of good will from U.S. newspaper publishers. The dedication ceremony took place at 10 a.m. on January 17, 1889, Franklin's birthday. The unveiling was done by Franklin's great-granddaughter, Mrs. H. W. Emory. In an article covering the event, The Post wrote "[t]he statue was uncovered without ostentation or parade, Mr. Hutchins having declined a great many suggestions to make what he styles a 'fuss' over it."

=== Later history ===
In 1893, The Post moved its headquarters, but the statue remained in the same place. Several years later the local government created a triangular plaza where the statue is located in order for traffic to run more smoothly. A new bank that opened across from the statue in 1914 was named Franklin National Bank due to the statue facing its building. The statue became a meeting spot for various groups in the early 20-century. The Salvation Army would use the location to proselytize, suffragists met there in 1915, and it was also a meeting place for disarmament activists following World War I. On Franklin's birthday, it wasn't uncommon for people to lay wreaths in front of the statue.

Over time, the statue became dirty and was in serious need of cleaning. Because most statues in public spaces in Washington, D.C., are located on federal property, it is the government's responsibility to maintain these memorials, but since the Franklin statue had been a gift to the city, it was left to the local government to carry out this task. Local officials said they had neither the funds nor reasoning to pay for the statue's upkeep. During the 1960s and 1970s, federal officials and the Pennsylvania Avenue Development Corporation made plans and carried out massive changes to the portion of Pennsylvania Avenue between the United States Capitol and the White House. In 1974, a portion of D Street was closed and made into a public space. This necessitated the moving of Franklin's statue. The new spot chosen for the statue was in front of the Old Post Office, due to Franklin being America's first Postmaster General. The relocation took place in late 1980.

The statue of Franklin is one of fourteen American Revolution statues that were collectively listed on the National Register of Historic Places (NRHP) on July 14, 1978. The following year the statues were added to the District of Columbia Inventory of Historic Sites. In addition, the Franklin statue is a contributing property to the Pennsylvania Avenue National Historic Site, listed on the NRHP on October 15, 1966, and the L'Enfant Plan, listed on April 24, 1997.

== See also ==
- List of public art in Washington, D.C., Ward 6
- National Register of Historic Places in Washington, D.C.
- Outdoor sculpture in Washington, D.C.
