= Stilson Hutchins =

American newspaper reporter and publisher

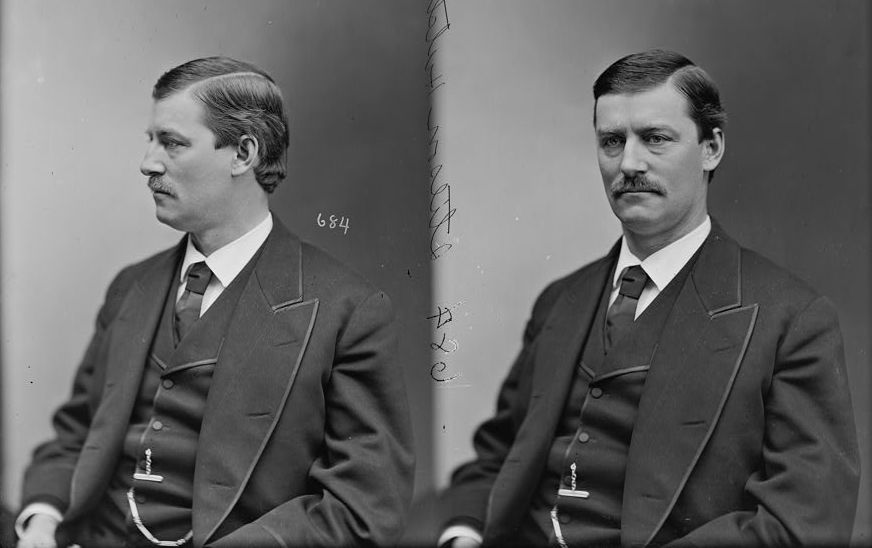
- Born: November 14, 1838; Whitefield, Coos County, New Hampshire, U.S.
- Died: April 23, 1912 (aged 73)
- Known for: Founder of The Washington Post

Stilson Hutchins (November 14, 1838 – April 23, 1912) was an American newspaper reporter and publisher, best known as founder of the broadsheet newspaper The Washington Post. Hutchins was also a Southern sympathizer and an outspoken racist against African Americans, Asian Americans, and immigrants.

== Life and career ==
Hutchins was born in Whitefield, Coos County, New Hampshire, on November 14, 1838, the son of Stilson Eastman Hutchins and Clara Eaton Hutchins. He moved to Iowa and took a job at the Dubuque Herald newspaper. In 1863, Hutchins became acting editor when Dennis Mahoney was absent. On April 5, 1863, acting editor Hutchins printed an editorial under his own name that deepened the paper's stance against African Americans: "Who wants to vote the (xxx)-emancipation ticket? Who wants Iowa covered with indolent blacks? Answer at the polls."

Hutchins later moved to Saint Louis, Missouri, where he established the Saint Louis Times newspaper in 1866 and became a Missouri state representative for the Democratic Party.

He then moved to Washington, D.C., where he founded The Washington Post to advance Democratic Party views. It was first published on December 6, 1877; within a year, circulation topped 6,000 copies per day. In 1880, Hungarian-born immigrant Joseph Pulitzer joined the staff. In 1889, Hutchins bought out the Washington's other morning newspaper, The Republican National.

In 1889, he sold The Post in 1889 to owners who retained the newspaper's racist tone. (In 1919, Post stories about a black man who raped a white woman would spur the 1919 Washington race riots, which targeted African Americans and their homes and businesses and left several white and black people dead.)

In 1889, Hutchins commissioned a statue of Benjamin Franklin to stand at the corner of Pennsylvania Avenue and 10th street, overlooking what were then the offices of The Washington Post. In 1890, he commissioned a sculpture of Charles Dickens from Francis Edwin Elwell, but backed out of the deal. In 1900, Hutchins also funded Gaetano Trentanove's Daniel Webster Memorial in Scott Circle, Washington, D.C.

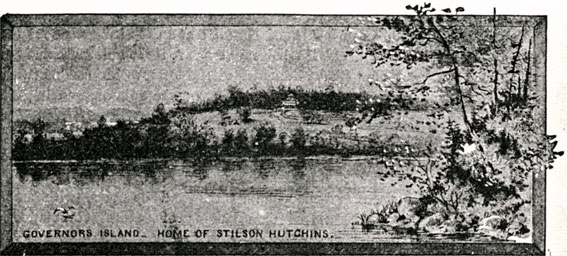
Illustration in an 1889 guidebook issued by the Passenger Department of the Boston & Maine Railroad.

In August 1883, Hutchins had leased Governor's Island, on Lake Winnipesaukee in Gilford, New Hampshire, from Isaiah Morrill of Gilford, for $1,000 per year for 99 years, "with the privilege of purchasing the island within twenty years for the sum of $20,000". The arrangement took effect January 1, 1884. Hutchins built a mansion on the island in 1885. In 1903, he leased the mansion to the Ambassador from Germany, Baron Speck von Sternburg, who established a summer embassy there with a retinue of at least 20 persons. The Baron later wrote that the view from the mansion was as magnificent as anything in Switzerland or Bavaria, and that the advertising which he gave the region caused the sale of other summer property. The mansion was sold by the Hutchins family in the late 1920s and burned down on August 1, 1935. While the mansion was once the only one on the island, now there are scores of large private homes.

In 1897, Hutchins bought Oatlands Plantation in Leesburg, Virginia, but never lived on the property, eventually selling it to William Corcoran Eustis in 1903.

Hutchins was later the publisher of the first Washington Times (founded 1894 by Rep. Charles G. Conn, and later sold to Frank A. Munsey, who sold it to William Randolph Hearst, who sold it to Eleanor Josephine Medill Patterson ("Cissy" Patterson), who merged it with the Washington Herald to form the Washington Times-Herald. She was bought out by the Meyer family in 1954, who merged it with the Washington Post.)

Hutchins, died at his home aged 73 in Washington, D.C., on April 23, 1912, and was interred at Rock Creek Cemetery.
