= Scott Circle =

Coordinates: 38.90724°N 77.036508°W

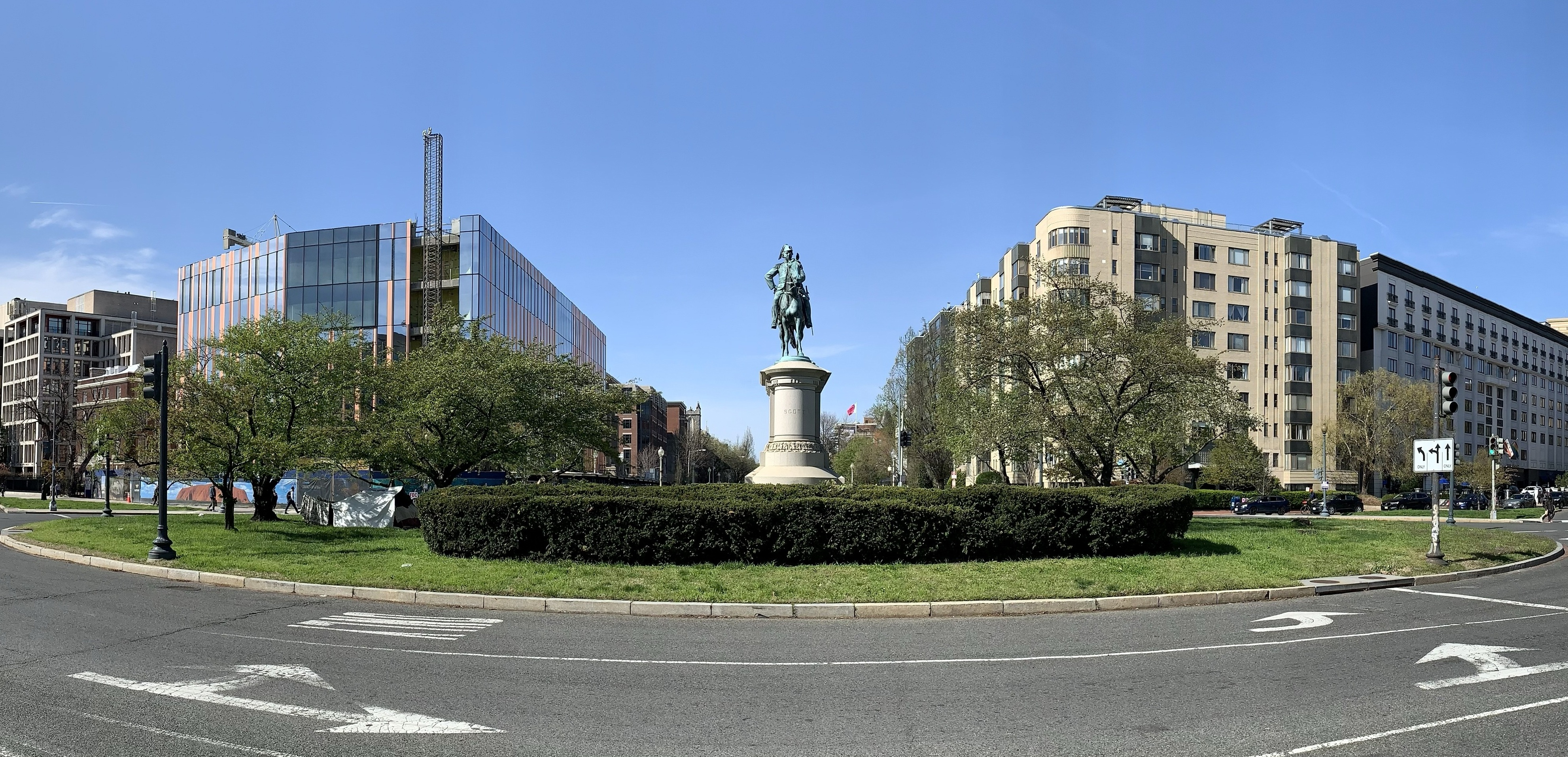
- General Winfield Scott Memorial
- Interactive map of Scott Circle

Location
- Washington, D.C.
- Roads at junction: Massachusetts Avenue NW; Rhode Island Avenue NW; 16th Street NW; Various other local roads

Construction
- Type: Traffic circle with underpass
- Maintained by: DDOT

Scott Circle is historic roundabout and surrounding public space in Washington, D.C., located in Northwest D.C. The circle is situated five blocks north of the White House and Lafayette Park, marking the intersection of Massachusetts Avenue (Embassy Row), Rhode Island Avenue, and 16th Street NW.

== Geometry ==
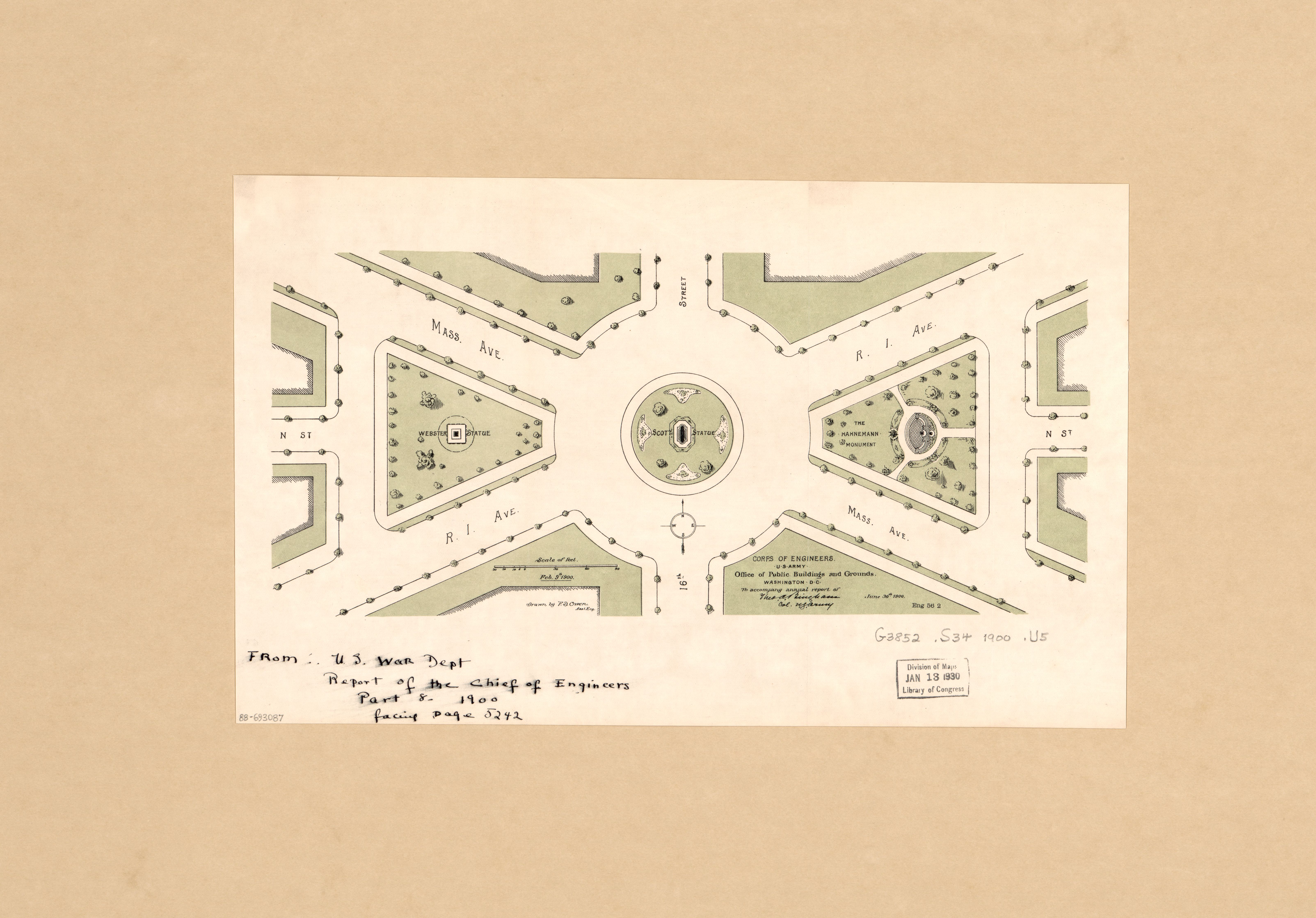
This diagram of the full bow-tie shape in the rectangle accompanied a 1900 Report of the Chief of Engineers, U.S. Army

Despite its name, the area has never been circular. On the original l'Enfant Plan for the city, the area was rectangular, which the revised Ellicott Plan expanded to a rectangle that incorporated the entire area between 17th Street to 15th Street and from O Street down to below N street. It was initially named Scott Square until changing name to "Circle" in the late 1870s.

The modern traffic junction has an interior roundabout but, with the bordering Corregidor Street and Bataan Street, Scott Circle overall takes a mirror symmetric (with a north–south axis) bow-tie shape, and the buildings around it in fact delineate a rectangle of space. The area that is public parkland forms the interior of the bow-tie shape, a central ellipse (major axis running east–west) interior to the roundabout with two triangles on its west and east sides.

== History ==
=== Development of "Jamaica" ===
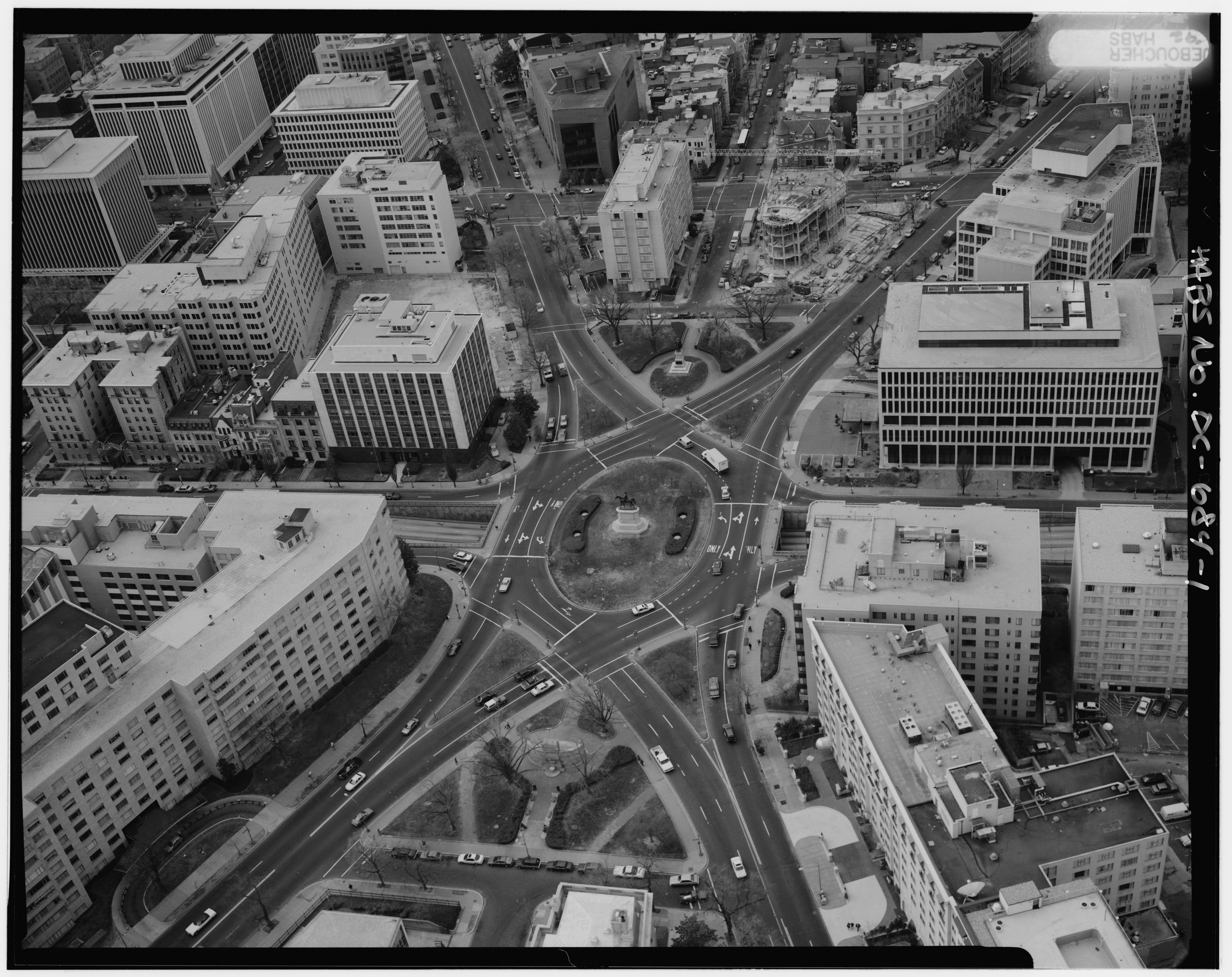
Scott Circle viewed from the air, in 1992, as part of the Historic American Buildings Survey

The tract of land on which Scott Circle was developed in the 1870s was before then known as "Jamaica". It was named Scott after Brevet Lt. General Winfield Scott, whose sculpture was erected in the circle in 1874, after being relocated there by Congress. Originally, the statue, a 15 feet (4.6 m) tall bronze of Scott on a horse sculpted by Henry Kirke Brown, was to be in what was then going to be called Scott Square, but is now known as McPherson Square; but Congress relocated it to the Massachusetts/Rhode Island intersection, facing south along 16th Street to the White House, in 1872.

Massachusetts Avenue was paved with concrete, and Rhode Island Avenue and 16th Street with wood; and Slash Run, a tributary of Rock Creek that had run through Jamaica, was enclosed into one of the sewer lines that was laid alongside water and gas utility lines.

=== Transition: residential to institutional ===
Initially, the area was a desirable residential area and the public space was intended to be a recreational area for the neighbourhood; but, although a few surrounding residences remain, in the 21st century most buildings are now institutional and the only remaining social function of Scott Circle is memorial.

The change came about in the first half of the 20th century. Although residential buildings such as a Georgian Revival style mansion built in 1906 by Simon Guggenheim on the corner of 16th and M Streets, a Beaux-Arts house built in 1907 by Carolina Caton Williams at 1227 16th Street, and John Russell Pope's 1912 neoclassical redesign of Levi Morton's Bell House, still existed; usage was to change a couple of decades later around the time of the Great Depression. In 1930 the Bell House changed from a private residence to the home of the National Democratic Club, and was later to be owned by the National Paint and Coatings Association. The residences south of it were razed and replaced by the headquarters of the American Association for the Advancement of Science (AAAS). The Chinese Legation to the United States took over a residential house to the north-east, the Peruvian Embassy took over the William Windom House, and in 1940 the Pendleton and Cameron private residences were razed and replaced by General Scott Apartments.

=== 16th Street underpass ===
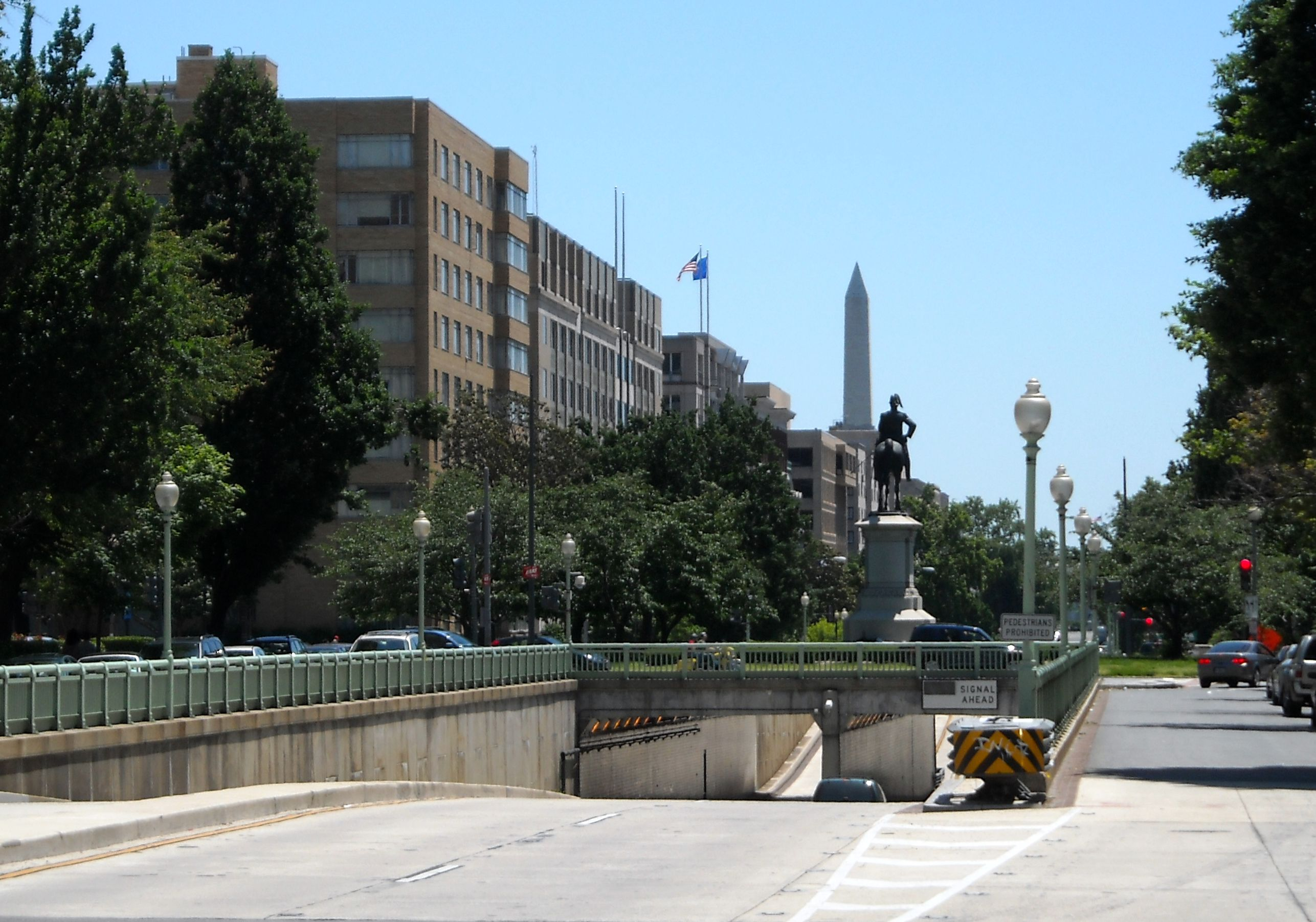
A view through the underpass along 16th Street looking southwards.

In order to accommodate the increased traffic from institutional use as opposed to residential use, in 1941 the road junction was rebuilt, with widened entry and exit roads for the roundabout, and new through-lanes for 16th Street passing under Scott Circle in a US$317,000 (equivalent to $6,776,771 in 2024) tunnel that began construction on 3 February 1941 and opened on 29 December 1941.

The 1940 construction of the underpass at Thomas Circle had left Scott as "one of the worst remaining traffic bottlenecks in the city" in need of improvements of its own. The underpass project, funded by the District of Columbia with US$200,000 (equivalent to $4,488,836 in 2024) from its gasoline tax with the balance provided by federal aid, had engendered controversy with residents forming two camps of lobbyists, each lobbying for the underpass to follow the course of the street where the other residents lived.

The construction contract for the underpass itself had been awarded to Cayuga Construction Company of New York on 29 December 1940, and a separate contract of US$114,000 (equivalent to $2,558,637 in 2024) for paving the street approaches to the Union Paving Company of Washington. Construction had involved re-laying 4,200 feet (1,300 m) of the original water and sewer lines, and moving the statue of Scott, as a single unit without detaching the bronze from the granite base, temporarily out of the way.

The lobbyists from 16th Street, led by Frank B. Steele, complained about reduced property values, the cutting down of trees, and excessive expenditure, stating that expanding the surface junction would be better, and that if there were to be an underpass the logical line for it would be along Massachusetts Avenue, following the line of the Thomas Circle underpass.

The lobbyists from Massachusetts Avenue, led by F. Scott Avery, countered that 16th Street was the logical course of the underpass, after they had discovered old records of the Slash Run running under Massachusetts Avenue, backing this up with drilling test results that showed the Avenue to be a poorer construction foundation than 16th Street would be. Several members of the U.S. House of Representatives became involved, as well as then Secretary of the Interior Harold L. Ickes, and the National Capital Park and Planning Commission decided upon the 16th Street route.

There was no planned formal ceremony to the opening. The traffic barricades were simply cleared away to let traffic through after the morning rush hour was over. The District commissioners intended to ride the first car through the underpass, but their car was overtaken by several other cars, a truck, and a bus.

== Embassy Row ==
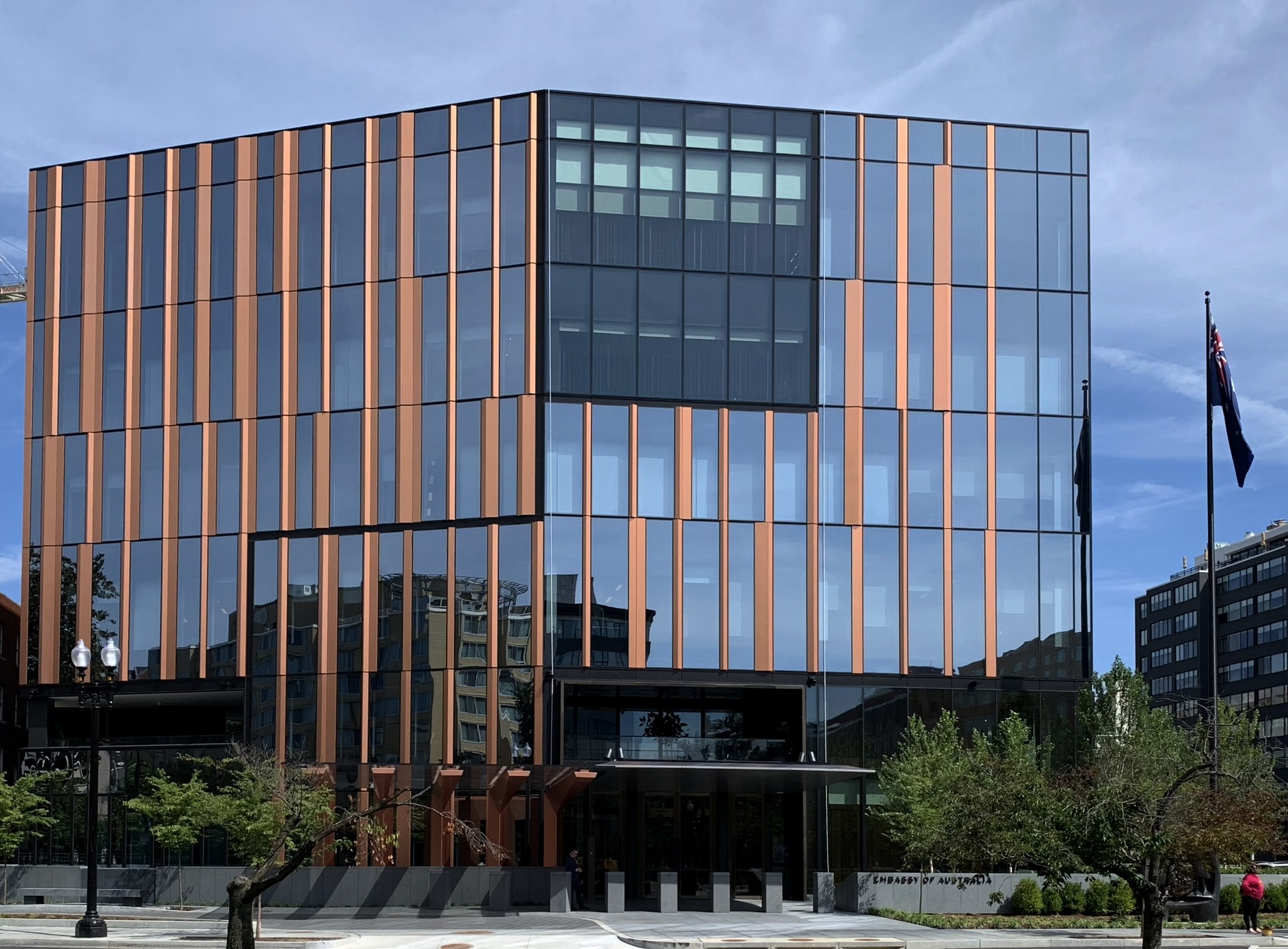
Embassy of Australia in 2023

The western arm of Massachusetts Avenue starting at Scott Circle became known as Embassy Row in the middle of the 20th century. The Peruvian Embassy, erstwhile William Windom House, was razed for the 1964 construction of the first Australian Embassy (at Scott) that opened in 1969, and by 1999 Embassy Row actually extended fully across Scott Circle with the Embassy of the Philippines built in 1993 and the Embassy of Tunisia taking over the AAAS building. Several hotels had also been constructed, including the Marriott Courtyard, the Wyndham Hotel, and the Governor's Inn. One hotel had been demolished, the Hotel Martinique on 16th Street, which along with the also-demolished Williams and Guggenheim houses had been replaced in 1968 by the offices of the National Education Association.

The 1960s Australian Embassy was demolished in 2020 to be replaced with a re-built larger one.

== Memorials ==
The memorial function remains in the 21st century, with the center ellipse containing an equestrian statue of Winfield Scott, and the triangle to the east holding the Daniel Webster Memorial and the triangle to the west holding the Samuel Hahnemann Monument.

== Recreation ==
The original neighborhood recreational use has largely vanished, with no pedestrian access at all to the central ellipse, and no pathways around it, it being entirely enclosed by roadways.

The Webster triangle is mainly occupied by hedges. The Hahnemann triangle has benches and shade trees.

== Gallery ==
Depictions of Scott Circle
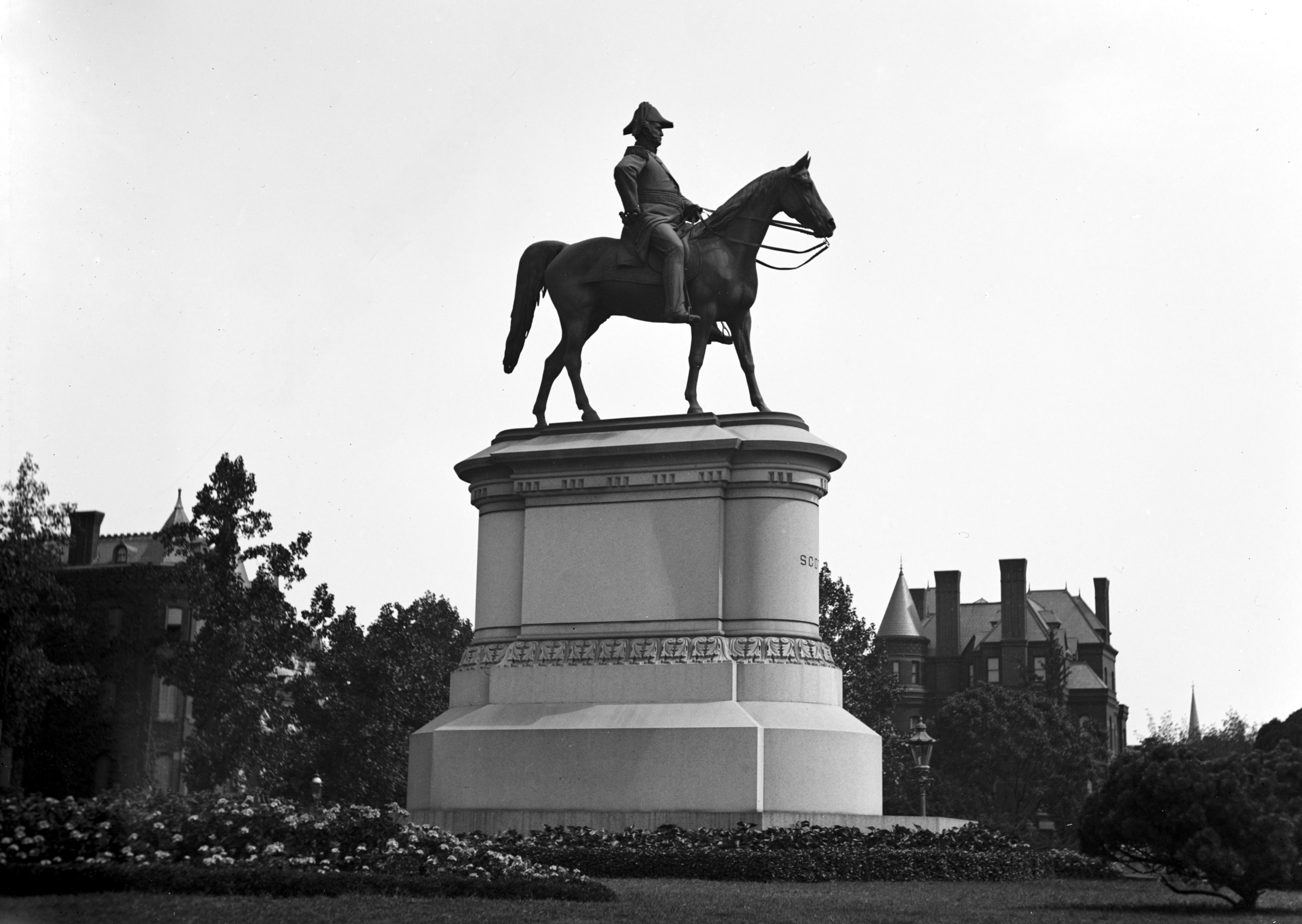
Winfield Scott equestrian statue in Scott Circle, looking east, in 1919

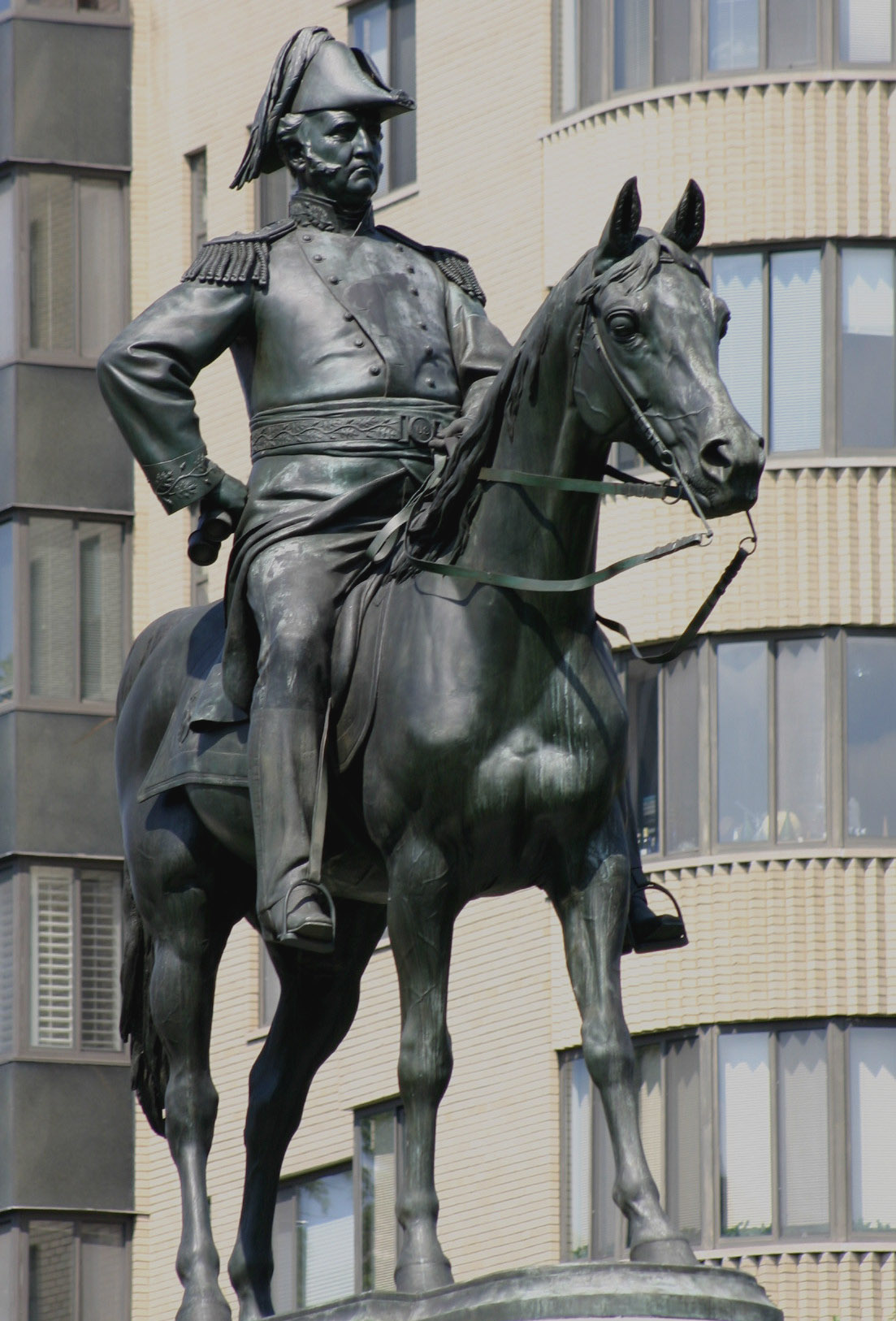
Close up of Winfield Scott equestrian statue in Scott Circle

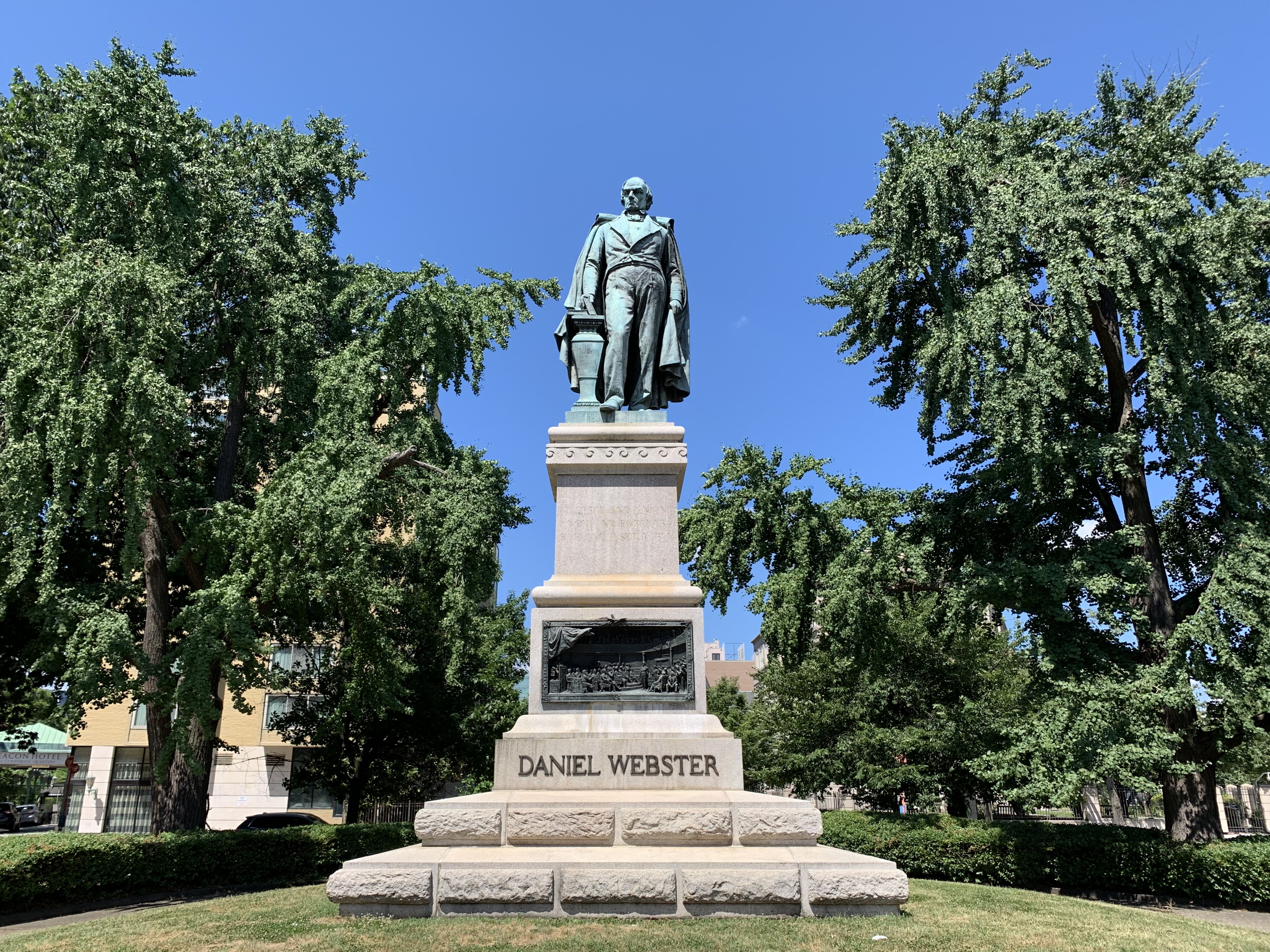
Daniel Webster memorial, west triangle of Scott Circle

Hahnemann Monument, east triangle of Scott Circle

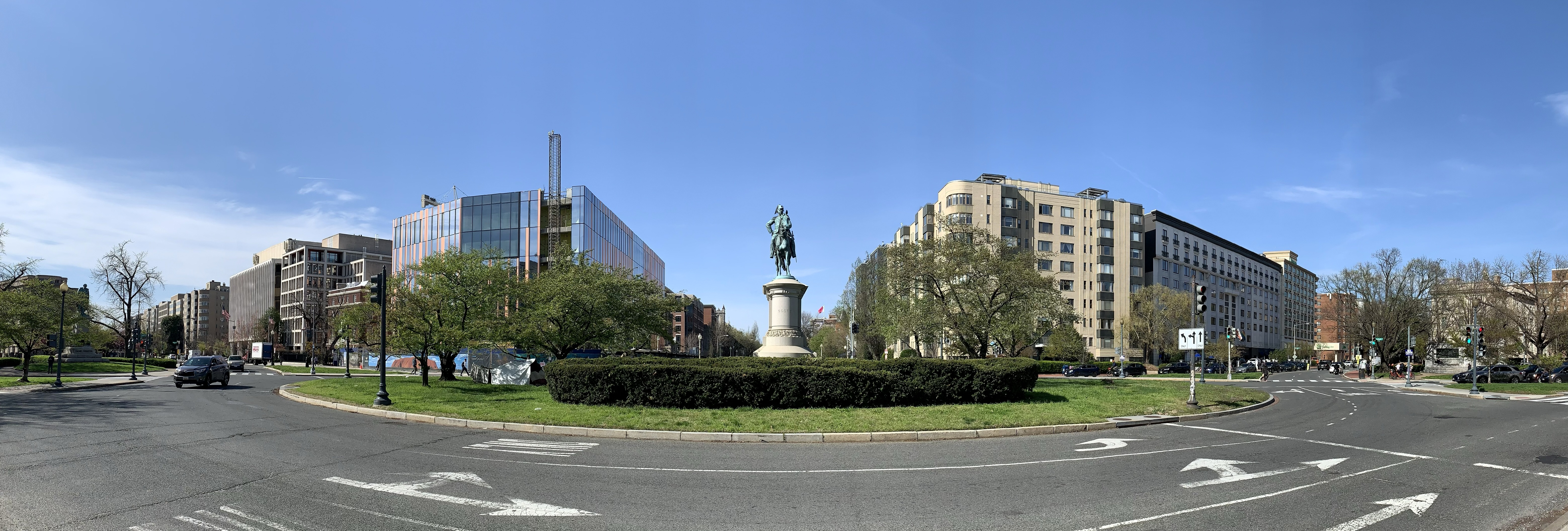
Scott Circle viewed from the south side in 2022
Example 1

== See also ==
- List of circles in Washington, D.C.
