= Maverick National Bank =

The Maverick National Bank was a bank in East Boston, Massachusetts, United States. It was established in 1854 and failed on October 31, 1891. The bank had extended large loans to its president, Asa P. Potter, who used the funds for speculative investments.

Much litigation followed the bank's failure, including Beal v. National Exchange Bank of Dallas and City of Somerville v. Beal. Potter was indicted for violations of banking law.

Nehemiah Gibson was a president and later a director of the bank.

In 1897, the remainder of the bank's assets, which included many worthless stocks and bonds of already defunct companies, were sold at auction by the Boston-based banking firm R.L. Day & Co., resulting in $429 of proceeds.
