= Rhode Island Avenue =

Street in Washington, DC, and Maryland, US

- Rhode Island Avenue NW; Rhode Island Avenue NE
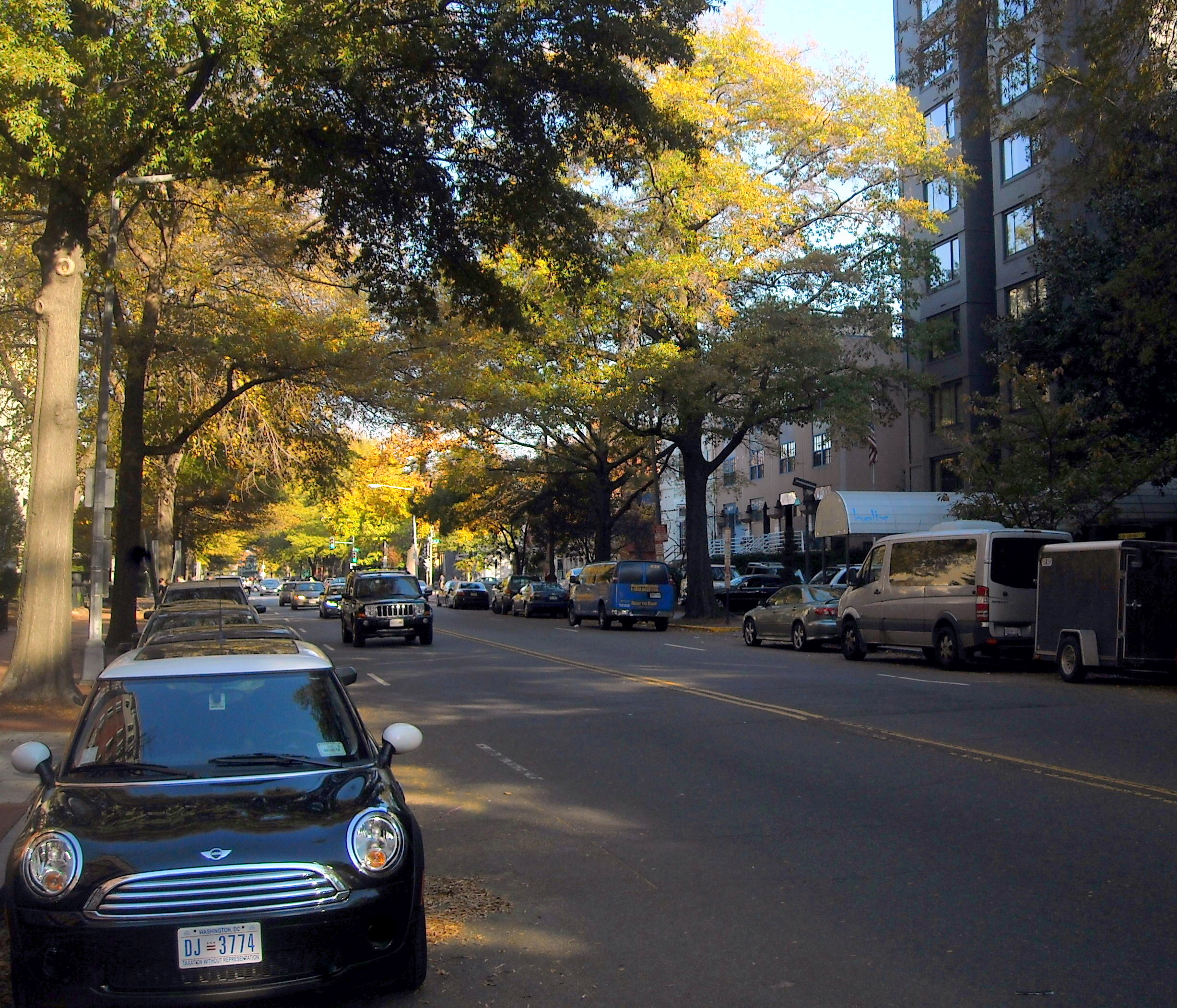
- 1400 block of Rhode Island Ave NW, in the Logan Circle neighborhood
- Interactive map of Rhode Island Avenue
- Namesake: Rhode Island
- Maintained by: DDOT
- Location: Washington, D.C., U.S.
- Coordinates: 38°55′14.65″N 76°59′52.15″W
- West end: Connecticut Avenue
- Major junctions: Scott Circle NW; Logan Circle NW; 7th Street NW; Florida Ave NW; North Capitol Street
- East end: US 1 (Rhode Island Avenue)

Rhode Island Avenue is a diagonal avenue in the Northwest and Northeast quadrants of Washington, D.C., and the capital's inner suburbs in Prince George's County, Maryland. Paralleling New York Avenue, Rhode Island Avenue was one of the original streets in Pierre L'Enfant's plan for the capital. It became a major commuter route, carrying U.S. Route 1 traffic into the city from Prince George's County.

The western terminus of Rhode Island Avenue is in downtown Washington, at an intersection with Connecticut Avenue NW and M Street NW. The Cathedral of St. Matthew the Apostle is on Rhode Island Avenue NW, just east of that intersection. Just east of the cathedral, at Scott Circle, Rhode Island Avenue NW intersects Massachusetts Avenue NW and 16th Street NW. N Street NW stops short of meeting the circle from either direction, but is instead connected to Rhode Island and Massachusetts avenues NW through two short streets, Corregidor Street NW and Bataan Street NW. From Scott Circle, Rhode Island Avenue NW continues eastward to the Logan Circle neighborhood. At the traffic circle of the same name, Rhode Island Avenue NW intersects Vermont Avenue, 13th Street, and P Street NW.

East of Logan Circle, Rhode Island Avenue passes through primarily residential neighborhoods such as Bloomingdale, Shaw and Brentwood. Rhode Island Avenue is U.S. Route 29 between 7th and 11th streets NW, and U.S. Route 1 east of 6th Street NW. In Northeast Washington, Rhode Island Avenue NE is served by the Rhode Island Avenue–Brentwood station on the Red Line and the Shaw–Howard University station on the Green Line of the Washington Metro.

In 1926, Rhode Island Avenue NE was extended from the District line into Maryland, through Mount Rainier, Brentwood, and North Brentwood.

In downtown Hyattsville, Rhode Island Avenue merges into Baltimore Avenue (U.S. Route 1 Alternate). U.S. Route 1 traffic continues north on Baltimore Avenue. Discontinuous segments of Rhode Island Avenue exist in Riverdale Park, College Park, and Beltsville, running along or alongside the abandoned Washington, Berwyn and Laurel Electric Railroad.

== Retail and mixed-use near metro station ==
The area along Rhode Island Avenue between 10th and 14th streets N.E. has been a key shopping area (for groceries, hardware, etc.) in D.C. at least since the 1930s. A "Park & Shop", an early name for a strip mall or neighborhood shopping center with the then-innovative feature of parking in front of the stores, opened here in 1938. Rhode Island Place is a 200,000 sq ft (19,000 m^{2}) power center anchored by Ross Dress For Less, Home Depot, and Giant supermarket. Adjacent Rhode Island Row has 70,000 sq ft (6,500 m^{2}) of retail space. Also adjacent is the Bryant Street NE development anchored by Alamo Drafthouse Cinema and Bryant Street Market food hall.
