= Kościuszko (disambiguation) =

Tadeusz Kościuszko was a soldier respected as a champion of liberty in both Poland and the United States.

For things named after this person, see List of things named after Tadeusz Kościuszko.

== War ==
- Kościuszko Uprising, a 1794 Polish war of independence

== Military ==
- Kościuszko's Squadron, a Polish fighter squadron in the Polish-Soviet War of 1919–21
- No. 303 Squadron RAF, known as the No. 303 "Kościuszko", was a Second World War Polish fighter squadron
- 1st Tadeusz Kościuszko Infantry Division, a Second World War unit, part of the 1st Polish Army
- 111th Fighter Escadrille (Poland), known as Kościuszko's squadron, was a Polish fighter squadron in the Invasion of Poland of 1939
- Tadeusz Kościuszko Land Forces Military Academy in Wrocław, Poland

== Ships ==
- ORP Generał Tadeusz Kościuszko, a Polish Navy rocket frigate
- SS Kościuszko, a Polish ocean liner
- Kosciusko a ferry on Sydney Harbour named after Mount Kosciuszko

== Places ==
=== Antarctica ===
- Mount Kosciusko (Antarctica), a mountain in Marie Byrd Land, Antarctica

=== Australia ===
- Kosciuszko, New South Wales, a locality in the Snowy Valleys Region
- Kosciuszko National Park, New South Wales
- Mount Kosciuszko, the highest mountain in Australia (not including its external territories)

=== United States ===
- Kosciusko, Mississippi
- Kosciusko, Texas
- Kosciusko County, Indiana
- Kosciuszko Park (Chicago)
- Kosciusko Island in Alaska
- Kosciuszko Bridge in New York City
- Thaddeus Kosciusko Bridge in Albany, New York
- Thaddeus Kosciuszko National Memorial in Philadelphia, Pennsylvania

=== Poland ===
- Kościuszko Mound in Kraków

== Music ==
- "Kosciusko" is a track on Midnight Oil's album Red Sails in the Sunset
- Kosciuszko is a 2011 album by the Australian alternative rock band Jebediah

== People ==
- Jacques Kosciusco-Morizet (1913-1994), French ambassador
- Nathalie Kosciusko-Morizet, a French politician

== Products ==
- Kosciusko mustard, a Plochman's brand
