= Commemoration of Tadeusz Kościuszko =

Memorials to Polish national hero

Tadeusz Kościuszko is one of the most honored people in Polish history, in terms of places and events named in his honor.

As a national hero of Poland, Lithuania, Belarus, and the United States, Kościuszko has given his name to many places and monuments around the world.

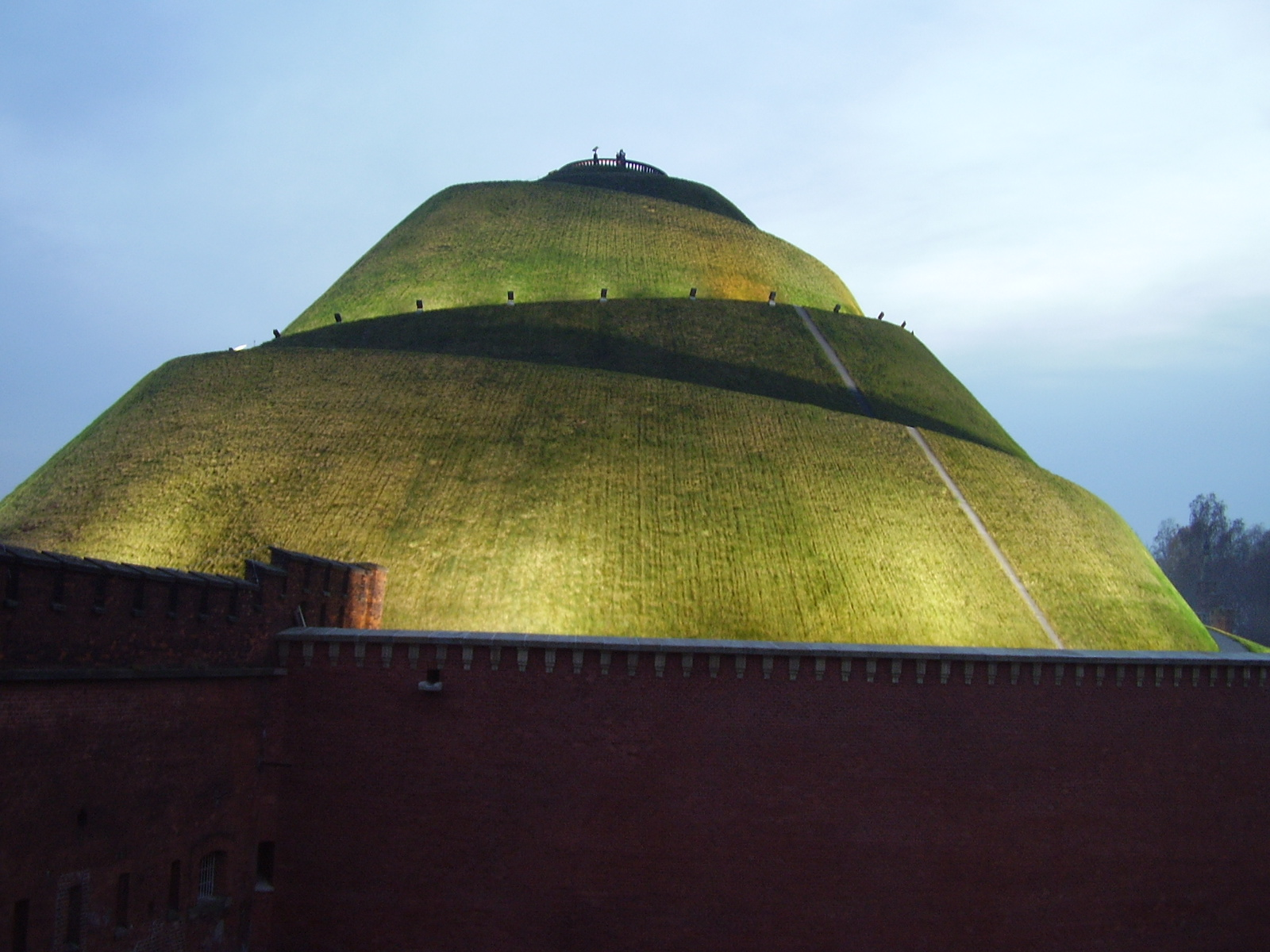
Kościuszko Mound, Kraków, Poland

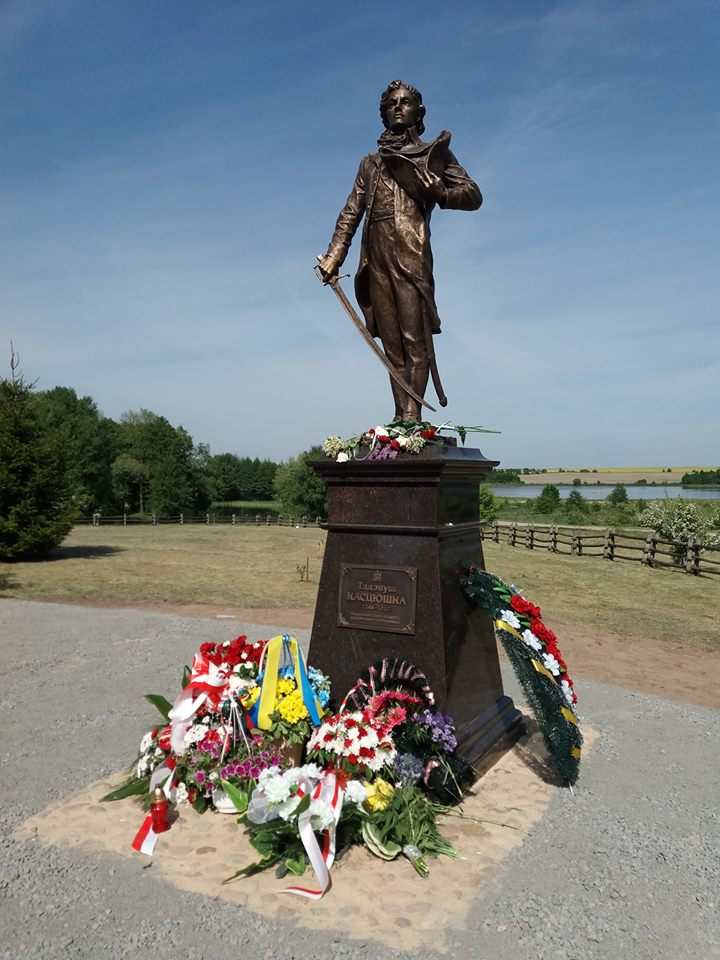
The first monument to Kościuszko in Belarus erected in 2018

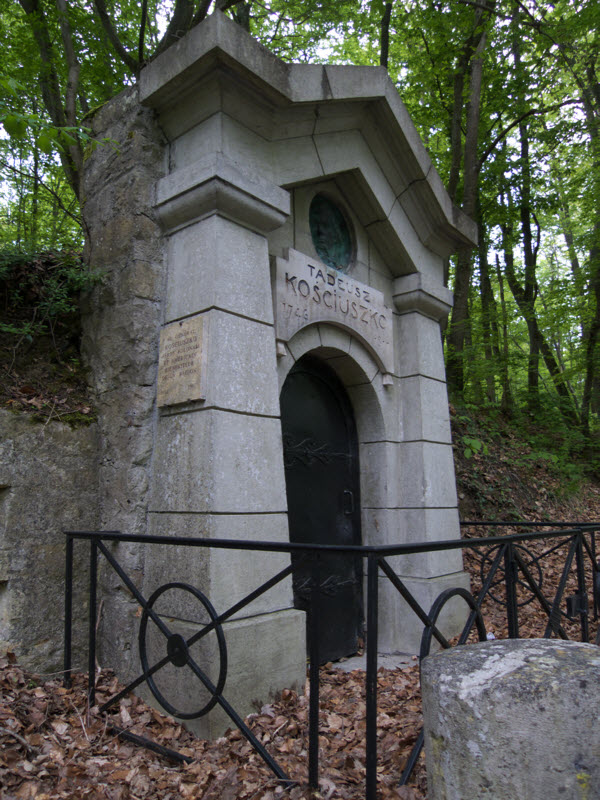
Kościuszko monument, Montigny-sur-Loing, France

== Commemorations by place ==
=== Poland ===
In Poland, nearly every major town has a street or square named for Kościuszko.

Between 1820 and 1823, the people of Kraków erected the Kościuszko Mound to commemorate the Polish leader. A similar mound was erected in 1861 at Olkusz.

He is the patron of Kraków University of Technology, Wrocław Military University, and countless other schools and gymnasia (secondary schools) throughout Poland.

He was the patron of the 1st Regiment of the Polish 5th Rifle Division, and of the 1st Division of the Polish 1st Army. After World War I the Kościuszko Squadron, and during World War II the 303rd Polish Squadron, were named for him. Two ships have been named for him: SS Kościuszko, and ORP Generał Tadeusz Kościuszko (a former United States Navy frigate that was transferred to Poland).

There is a Kościuszko Monument at the entrance to Kraków's Wawel Castle, where he was laid to rest. Its replica was erected in Detroit, Michigan in 1978 (pictured in gallery below). A replica of the Brigadier General Thaddeus Kosciuszko monument in Washington, D.C. by Antoni Popiel was erected in 2010 in Warsaw, Poland.

The plane involved in the crash of LOT Polish Airlines Flight 5055 was named for him.

=== Belarus ===
In Belarus, in the manor of Mieračoŭščyna - the birthplace of Kościuszko - a monument was opened on 12 May 2018. This became the first monument to Kościuszko in the country, and it was financed and produced through a crowdfunding campaign organized by a journalist Gleb Labadzenka (Hlieb Labadzienka). The campaign received financing from over 700 private contributors, and a monument design by Henik Lojka won the competition. Installation of the monument was organized by the local authorities of the Ivacevičy District.

Furthermore, besides the museum in Meračoŭščyna there is another small museum, the "Gosudarstvennoe učreždenie kul'tury Žabinkovskij rajonnyj istoriko-kraevedčeskij musej" in the Tadėvuš-Kascjuška-Street in Malyja Sjachnovičy, a small village between Brest and Kobryn in Belarus. There is a room dedicated to the life of Tadeusz Kościuszko in Sjachnovičy. In front of the building is a bust of Kościuszko, which was built in 1932 by Bal'bina Vidatskaja-Svitič and was set up in 1988 in Kobrin, the next largest city. During the Soviet era, this was initially covered and was transferred in 1988 to its present location.

A second bust displaying Kościuszko was unveiled in 2005 in the court yard of the American embassy in Minsk.

=== France ===
Polish political refugees in Montigny-sur-Loing settled in La Genevraye at Castle Berville and participated actively in the life of the commune and that of La Genevraye, including establishing a brickworks. In 1814 Kościuszko intervened to stop the Cossacks after the Russians had penetrated into Champagne-sur-Seine. Subsequently, a monument was built, Ancienne chapelle de Kosciusko. This symbolic tomb still stands at the edge of the Forest of Fontainebleau, where it receives an annual tribute of flowers.

=== United States ===
A plethora of sites are dedicated to Kosciuszko in the United States. Both Kosciusko, Mississippi. and Kosciusko, Texas are named in his honor, as is Kosciusko County, Indiana, and Kosciusko Island in Alaska. Monmouth, Illinois, was originally to be called Kosciuszko after that name was drawn from a hat around 1831, until it was decided that Kosciuszko would be too hard to pronounce, so Monmouth was selected as an alternative.

Kosciuszko's Philadelphia home is preserved as Thaddeus Kosciuszko National Memorial, administered as part of Independence National Historical Park; and a monument to him stands at the corner of Benjamin Franklin Parkway and 18th Street.

New York State possesses two bridges in his name: the Thaddeus Kosciusko Bridge in Latham on Interstate 87 just north of Albany, and the Kosciuszko Bridge on Interstate 278. There is also a New York City Subway stop at Kosciuszko Street, serving the J train. There is another Kosciuszko Bridge that crosses the Naugatuck River in Naugatuck, Connecticut.

There are Kosciuszko Streets in Brooklyn, New York; Buffalo, New York; Rochester, New York; Toledo, Ohio, Manchester, New Hampshire; Nanticoke, Pennsylvania; South Bend, Indiana; Woburn, Massachusetts; and Bay City, Michigan. Kosciuszko Way can be found in Pittsburgh; Kosciusko Avenue in Cleveland; and General Thaddeus Kosciusko Way in downtown Los Angeles. There are two highways named in his honor: the Thaddeus Kosciuszko Memorial as part of Route 9 in New Britain, Connecticut and General Thaddeus Kosciusko Memorial Highway as part of State Route 257.

There are Thaddeus Kosciuszko Parks in Dublin, Ohio and Stamford, Connecticut. The Logan Square neighborhood of Chicago has a Kosciuszko Park, as does East Chicago, Indiana.

Equestrian statues of him can be found at Kosciuszko Park in Milwaukee, across from the Polish Basilica of St. Josaphat, Chicago's Museum Campus on Solidarity Drive and in Detroit on Michigan Avenue at Third Street. Other statues can be found in Boston Public Garden; Scranton, Pennsylvania; a bust in the U.S. Capitol as well as a statue Lafayette Park in Washington, D.C.; the United States Military Academy at West Point; Williams Park; in St. Petersburg, Florida; and Red Bud Springs Memorial Park in Kosciusko, Mississippi; in Kosciuszko Park in East Chicago, Indiana; and (with Kazimierz Pułaski) in Poland, Ohio, a township and village named in honor of the two heroes of the American Revolution.

The Kościuszko Polish Patriotic Social Society in Natrona, Pennsylvania, is named after Kościuszko. Mount Pleasant, Pennsylvania has a Polish Falcons Sportsman's Club named after Kosciuszko. In Grand Rapids, Michigan, there is a club called Kosciuszko Hall.

Hamtramck, Michigan, has a Kosciuszko Middle School; Winona, Minnesota has Washington-Kosciuszko Elementary School; School in East Chicago. There is also a Polish school named after Tadeusz Kosciuszko, Polska Szkola im. Tadeusza Kosciuszki or the Thaddeus Kosciuszko School of Polish Language. In 1951 Mrs. Maria Zamora established the first classroom and now its one of the oldest and largest Polish language schools in the United States.

In addition, some of the American towns named Warsaw were given this name in appreciation of Kosciuszko, rather than due to a Polish origin of their founders.

The Kosciuszko Foundation is based in New York City and promotes Polish-American cultural exchange.

=== Switzerland ===
The Solothurn house that was Kościuszko's last residence, now houses a Kościuszko Museum, open to the public at certain stated times.

There is also a road named for him in Vezia (canton Ticino, near Lugano), where his embalmed heart rested for some decades following his death, Kościuszko having in his will left it to Emilia Morosini, née Zeltner-Peri. His heart was later moved to the Polish Museum in Rapperswil through the engagement of Arrigo Boito, composer and librettist to Giuseppe Verdi, both of whom were friends of the Morosini-Negroni family.

=== Australia ===
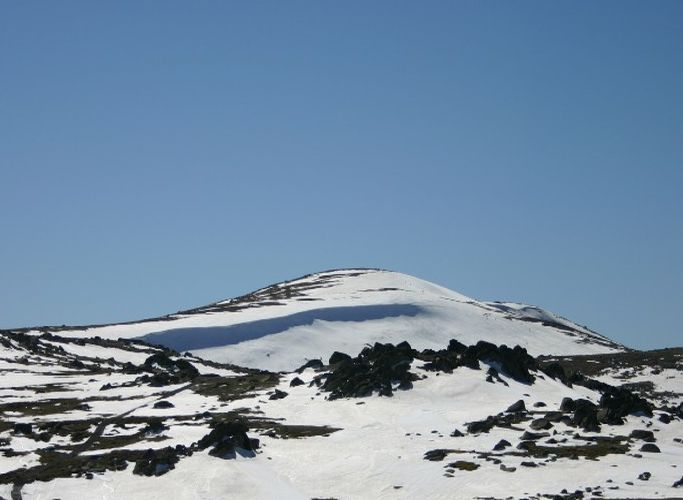
Mount Kosciuszko, Australia

Polish explorer Count Paweł Edmund Strzelecki named the highest mountain in Australia, Mount Kosciuszko. The mountain is the central feature of Kosciuszko National Park.

There is a Kosciusko Avenue in Geelong, and one in Canberra, the capital of Australia.

=== Elsewhere ===
There are also streets named for Kościuszko in Saint Petersburg, Russia; downtown Belgrade, Serbia (Ulica Tadeuša Košćuška); Budapest (Kosciuszkó Tádé utca); and Vilnius, Lithuania (Kosciuškos gatvė).

A small street is named for Kościuszko in Rio de Janeiro.

A Kościuszko monument in Minsk, Belarus, was dedicated in 2005.

Kościuszko is mentioned in Lord Byron's poem Age of Bronze in the line "That sound that crashes in the tyrant's ear --- Kosciusko!". Jules Verne in Twenty Thousand Leagues Under the Seas included Kościuszko's portrait in Captain Nemo's study.

== Commemorations by type ==
=== Places ===
==== Australia ====
- Kosciuszko National Park, New South Wales
- Mount Kosciuszko, the highest mountain in Australia (not including its external territories)

==== United States ====
- Kosciusko, Mississippi
- Kosciusko, St. Louis, Missouri
- Kosciusko, Texas
- Kosciusko County, Indiana
- Kosciusko Island, Alaska

=== Buildings, structures, and monuments ===
==== Poland ====
- Tadeusz Kościuszko Monument, Kraków
- Kościuszko Mound, Kraków
- Kościuszko Park, Katowice
- Camp Kosciuszko, Poznań, V Corps (United States) Forward Headquarters

==== United States ====
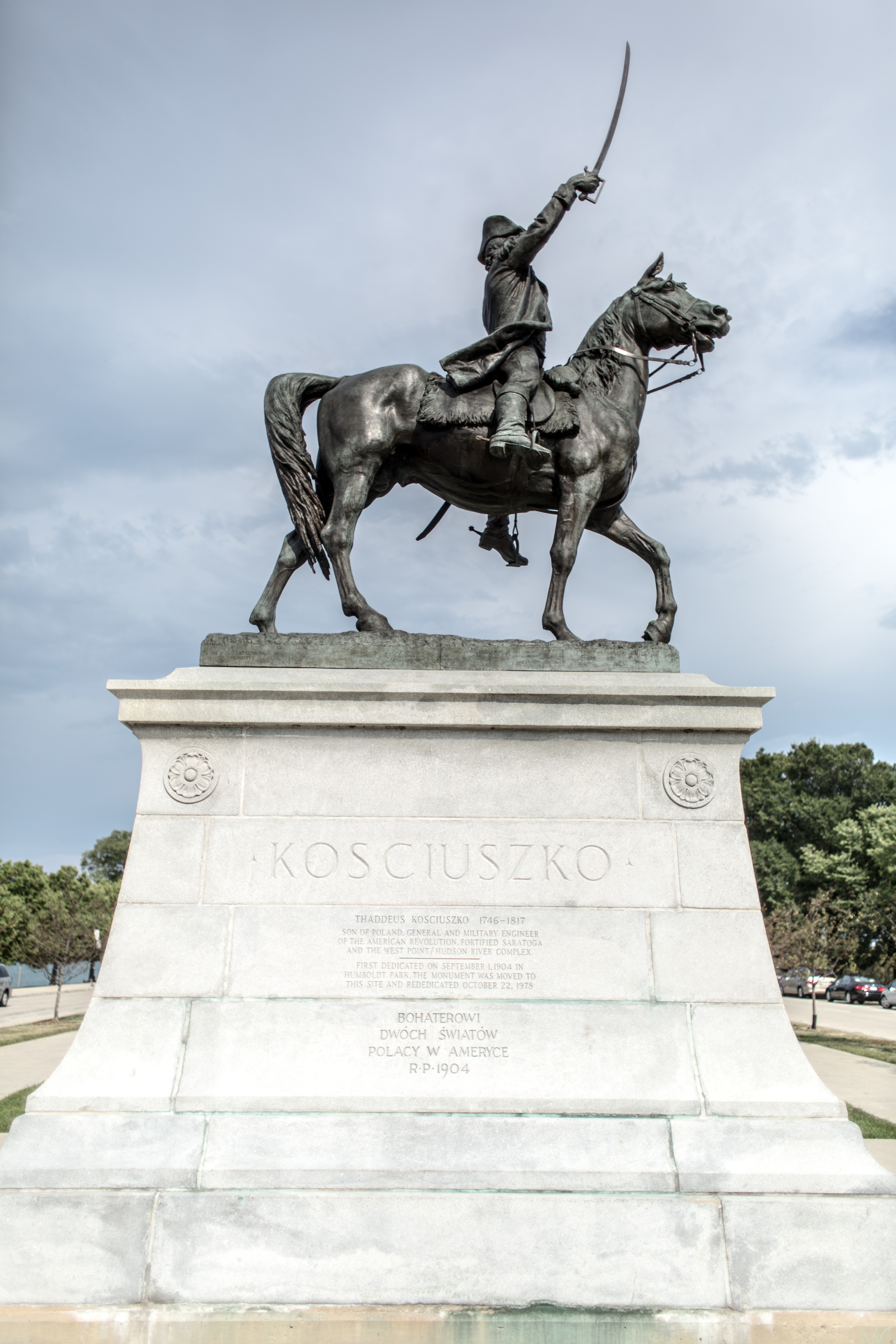
Statue of Kościuszko on Northerly Island, Chicago

- Kosciuszko's Monument (West Point)
- Kosciuszko Monument, Milwaukee
- Kosciuszko Park, Milwaukee
- Kosciuszko's Garden, West Point, New York
- Kosciuszko Bridge, New York City
- Thaddeus Kosciusko Bridge in Halfmoon and Colonie, New York
- Thaddeus Kosciuszko National Memorial in Philadelphia
- Kosciuszko Park (Chicago)
- Kosciuszko Street in Brooklyn, New York, its accompanying station on the New York City Subway, and the nearby Kosciuszko Pool.
- Kosciusko Street in Rochester, New York
- Kosciusko Way in Pittsburgh
- General Thaddeus Kosciuszko Way in Los Angeles
- Kosciuszko Street in the International Polish Village Toledo, Ohio
- Thaddeus Kosciuszko Circle, Boston
- Thaddeus Kosciuszko Park, Dublin, Ohio
- Thaddeus Kosciuszko Statue in the Public Garden, Boston
- Kosciuszko Monument, Williams Park, St. Petersburg, Florida
- Washington-Kosciuszko Elementary School, Winona, Minnesota
- Kosciuszko Street in Nanticoke, Pennsylvania
- Kosciuszko Park in Stamford, Connecticut
- Thaddeus Kosciuszko Highway in New Britain, Connecticut
- Kosciuszko Park in Wilmington, Delaware

==== Hungary ====
- Tadeusz Kościuszko Street, Budapest

==== Brazil ====
- Tadeu Kosciusco Street, Rio de Janeiro

==== Serbia ====
- Tadeuša Košćuška Street, Belgrade

Russia

- Kosciuszko street in Saint Petersburg, Russia

=== Organizations ===
- Kosciuszko Foundation
- Tadeusz Kościuszko University of Technology
- The Kosciuszko Institute
- The Kosciuszko Chair of Polish Studies at The Institute of World Politics

==== Military organizations ====
- Kościuszko's Squadron, a Polish fighter squadron in the Polish-Soviet War of 1919–1921
- No. 303 Polish Fighter Squadron, known as the No. 303 "Kościuszko", was a Second World War Polish fighter squadron
- Polish 1st Tadeusz Kościuszko Infantry Division, a Second World War unit, part of the 1st Polish Army
- Polish 111th Fighter Escadrille, known as Kościuszko's squadron, was a Polish fighter squadron in the Invasion of Poland of 1939
- Tadeusz Kościuszko Land Forces Military Academy in Wrocław, Poland

=== Ships ===
- ORP Generał Tadeusz Kościuszko, a Polish Navy guided missile frigate
- SS Kościuszko, a Polish ocean liner

=== Stamp ===
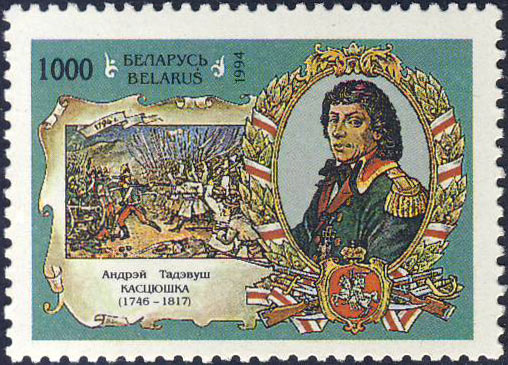
Tadeusz Kościuszko on stamp

In 1994, Belarus issued a postage stamp in commemorate of Tadeusz Kościuszko.

=== Airliners ===
- When LOT Polish Airlines used Ilyushin Il-62s and Il-62Ms. 2 of them were named after Kościuszko. One of these (SP-LBG) tragically crashed on 9 May 1987, killing 188 people.
