= Cape Pole, Alaska =

Unincorporated community in Alaska, United States

Cape Pole
- Populated Place
- Location in Alaska
- Coordinates: 55°57′54″N 133°47′36″W
- Country: United States
- State: Alaska
- Borough: Prince of Wales-Hyder
- Elevation: 6.6 ft (2 m)

Population (2010)
  - Total: 0
- Time zone: UTC-9 (Alaska (AKST))
  - Summer (DST): UTC-8 (AKDT)
- Area code: 907
- GNIS feature ID: 1420870

Cape Pole is a former census-designated place (CDP) and populated place on the eastern shore of Fishermans Harbor, on the southwest coast of Kosciusko Island in Prince of Wales-Hyder Census Area, Alaska. It was a thriving logging camp from 1954 until it was shut down by a federal court ruling in 1978. A post office was established in 1949 and discontinued in 1953. As of 2019, some buildings still remain at the townsite, but has not reported a separate population since 1980.

== History/Timeline ==
February 24, 1944, Coast Guard Cutter McLane delivers mail to Cape Pole while on Cape Decision Patrol

1946 Beginnings of Forest Entomology in Alaska: A Spruce Beetle Outbreak on Kosciusko Island Sets the Stage

WWII Initially logging on Kosciusco Island was based out of Edna Bay during World War II. Large Sitka Spruce trees were in high demand for making airplanes.

February 18, 1948, Coast Guard rescue plane that was forced down during a mercy flight from Ketchikan to Cape Pole in 1948

1949 The Cape Pole post office was established in 1949 and discontinued in 1953 (Ricks, 1965, p. 9)

1954 L.O.G. Logging established the Cape Pole logging camp in approximately 1954. The company was owned by Lawrenson, Olson and Gibbons. Lawrenson was in charge of the cutters, Ole Olson handled the logging operation. Cape Pole was one of many logging camps in the Tongass National Forest.

1962 Cape Pole is a logging community with a population of about 100 (Alaska Sportsman, 1962, no. 12, p. 28). there was a camp in both Edna Bay and Cape Pole. The timber fallers also known as cutters were mainly based out of Edna Bay while the logging operations were based mainly out of Cape Pole.

1965/1966 L.O.G Logging sold to Alaska Lumber & Pulp. Howard Clark became manager, Matt Phillips became timekeeper at approximately that time also.

1975/1976 Telephone and Television come to Cape Pole

Lawrenson's wife Stella was a nurse and handled injuries that did not require a doctor. In those days the trip to town to see a doctor was a major undertaking, so most medical issues were handled by Stella.

It is not entirely clear when the earliest residents of Cape Pole first moved there, but there were people with private property before and after the logging camp times.

Cape Pole was an isolated community in Southeast Alaska. Travel to and from the community was almost exclusively by seaplane mainly out of Ketchikan, Alaska.

A cargo boat, the Island Trader, operated out of Ketchikan delivered heavier freight and sometimes vehicles. It was referred to as the "Mail Boat."

Communications were entirely by mail or radio until around 1975 when the State of Alaska put in a satellite dish bringing limited television and telephone communications.

== History - Cape Pole School ==
The school at Cape Pole started out as a one room school. During its high point, it was a two room school with about 30 students. At the end it went back to a one room school.

Audrey Gumm wife of Phil Gumm (Forest Service Employee) was first school teacher

== Demographics ==
Historical population
Census	Pop.	Note	%±
1960	92		—
1970	123		33.7%
1980	29		−76.4%
U.S. Decennial Census

Cape Pole first appeared on the 1960 U.S. Census as an unincorporated village. It was made a census-designated place in 1980. With the discontinuation of logging and the departure of most of its residents, it was removed as a CDP in 1990 and has not appeared on the census since.

== People of Cape Pole ==
Verdie Bowen - Wasilla Councilman 2004

== Geography ==
Cape Pole is located at 55°57′54″N 133°47′36″W (55.9650, -133.7933)
