= Tadeusz Kościuszko Monument (Chicago) =

Equestrian statue in Chicago, Illinois, U.S.

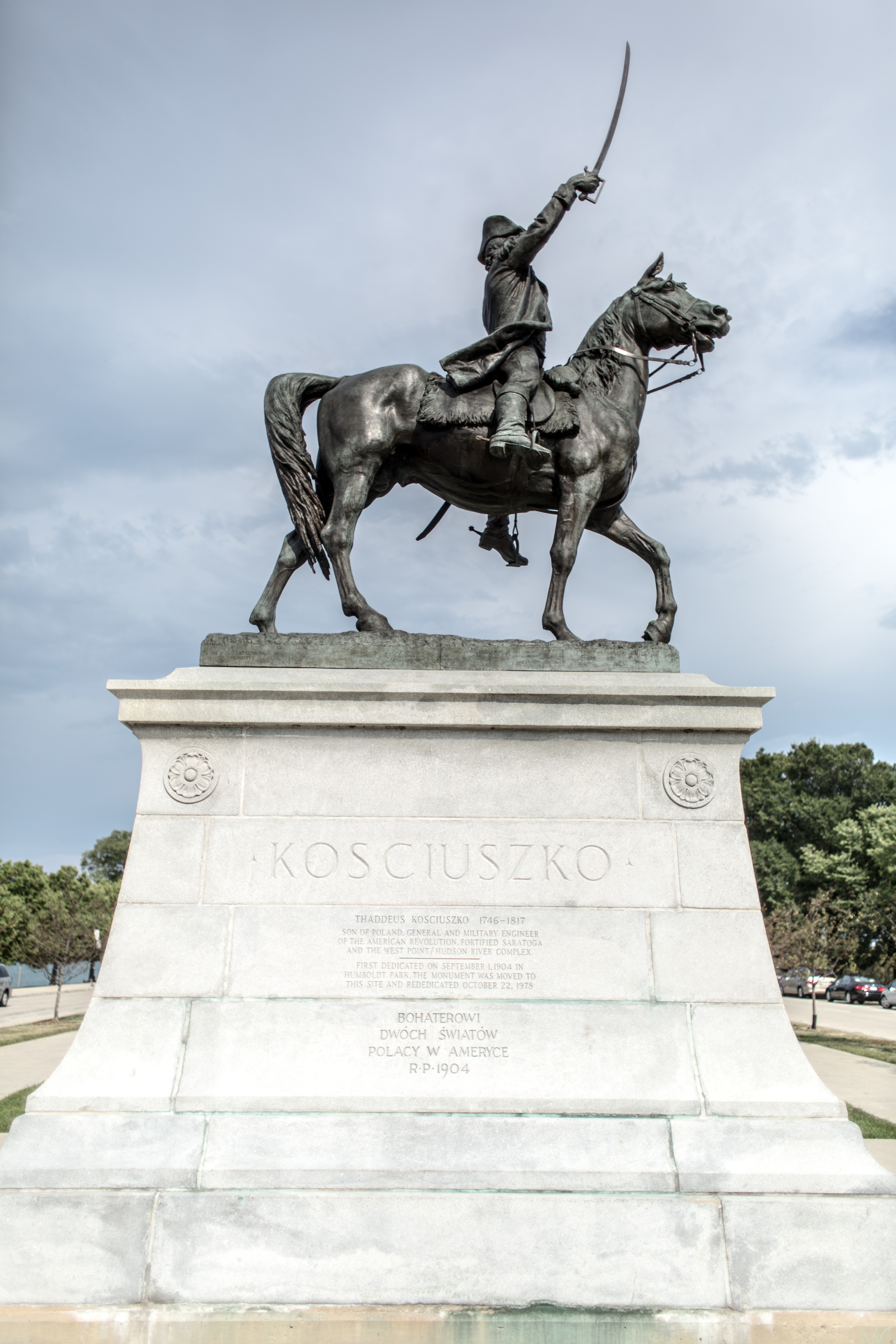
- The monument in 2015
- Artist: Kazimierz Chodziński
- Subject: Tadeusz Kościuszko
- Location: Chicago, Illinois, U.S.
- 41.866277°N 87.61249°W

The Tadeusz Kościuszko Monument, also known as the Tadeusz Kościuszko Memorial and the Thaddeus Kosciuszko Memorial, is an outdoor sculpture by artist Kazimierz Chodziński depicting Tadeusz Kościuszko, installed in the median of East Solidarity Drive, near Chicago's Shedd Aquarium, in the U.S. state of Illinois. The statue was created in 1904, and was originally located in Humboldt Park.

== See also ==
- 1904 in art
- Commemoration of Tadeusz Kościuszko
- Kosciuszko Park (Chicago)
- List of things named after Tadeusz Kościuszko
- Tadeusz Kościuszko Monument, Kraków
- Tadeusz Kościuszko Monument, Warsaw
