= Equestrian statue of Casimir Pulaski =

Statue by Kazimierz Chodziński in Washington, D.C., U.S.

- General Casimir Pulaski
- U.S. Historic district – Contributing property
- D.C. Inventory of Historic Sites
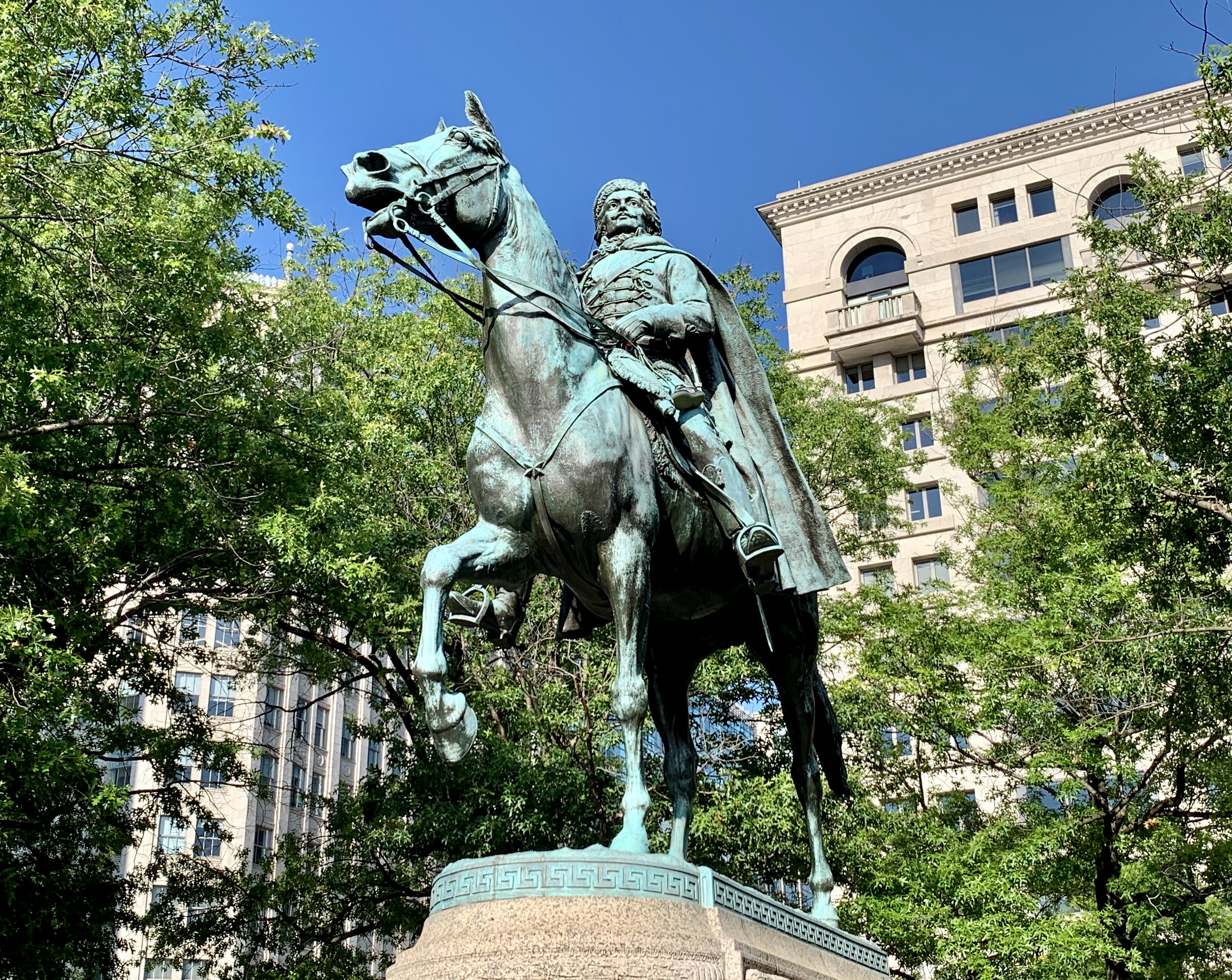
- Statue of Casimir Pulaski in 2020
- Location: Freedom Plaza, Washington, D.C.
- Coordinates: 38°53′45.24″N 77°1′48″W
- Built: 1910
- Architect: • Kazimierz Chodziński (sculptor) • Albert Randolph Ross (architect) • Maine & New Hampshire Granite Company (contractor) • Gorham Manufacturing Company (founder)
- Part of: • Pennsylvania Avenue National Historic Site (66000865)• American Revolution Statuary (78000256) • L'Enfant Plan (97000332)

Significant dates
- Added to NRHP: • October 15, 1966 (Pennsylvania Avenue National Historic Site) • July 14, 1978 (American Revolution Statuary) • April 24, 1997 (L'Enfant Plan)
- Designated DCIHS: • November 8, 1964 (L'Enfant Plan) • June 19, 1973 (Pennsylvania Avenue National Historic Site) • March 3, 1979 (American Revolution Statuary)

General Casimir Pulaski is a bronze equestrian statue of Casimir Pulaski, a military man born in the Polish–Lithuanian Commonwealth. He joined the military at a young age, fighting for removal of the king, who was backed by Russia. After his side lost the war, he fled to Paris, where he met Benjamin Franklin. Impressed by Pulaski, Franklin wrote a letter of recommendation to George Washington, suggesting he would be a helpful soldier during the American Revolutionary War. After arriving in the U.S., Pulaski eventually was promoted to Brigadier General and commanded a cavalry unit, the Pulaski's Legion. He died in 1779, due to injuries sustained in battle.

In 1903, Congress authorized the installation of a statue honoring two Poles who assisted America in the war: Pulaski and Tadeusz Kościuszko. Each statue was allocated $50,000 for its creation and installation. The person chosen to sculpt the Pulaski statue was Kazimierz Chodziński, who was assisted by architect Albert Randolph Ross. The unveiling and dedication ceremony took place on May 11, 1910, and was attended by thousands of Polish Americans. Prominent attendees included President William Howard Taft, who spoke at the ceremony, and Secretary of War Jacob M. Dickinson, who delivered the keynote speech.

The statue is located on the eastern end of Freedom Plaza, near the intersection of 13th Street and Pennsylvania Avenue NW, Washington, D.C. It shows a mounted figure of Pulaski, holding the reins to his horse, while wearing his Polish military uniform. There is a large plaque on the base of the marble statue.

The statue is one of 14 American Revolution statues in Washington, D.C., that were collectively listed on the National Register of Historic Places (NRHP). The statue is also a contributing property to the Pennsylvania Avenue National Historic Site and the L'Enfant Plan, both listed on the NRHP.

== History ==
=== Biography ===
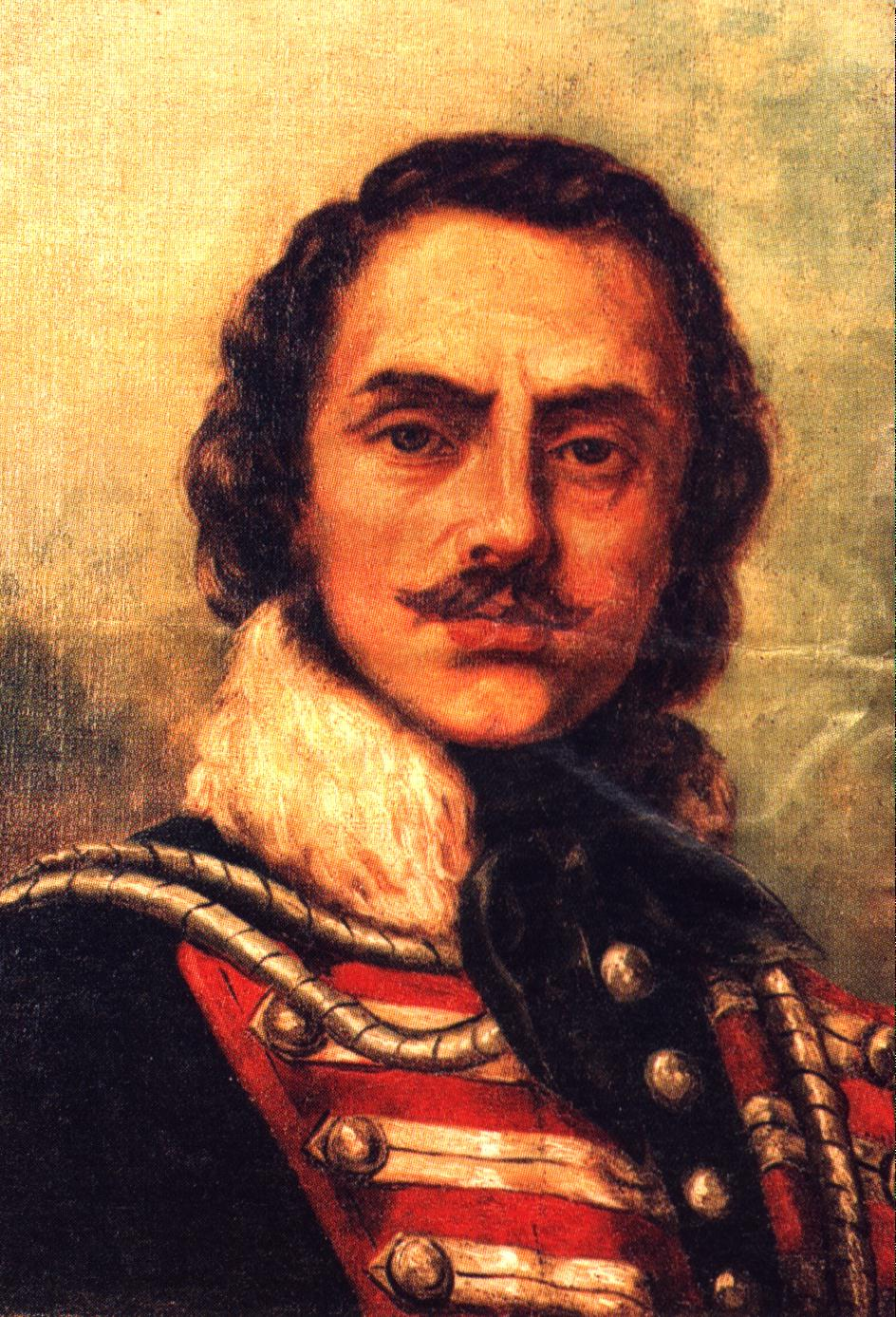
Casimir Pulaski

Casimir Pulaski was born in 1745 to wealthy parents in Warsaw, Polish–Lithuanian Commonwealth. By 1762 he already joined the military. A few years later. Pulaski joined other Polish nobility in the Bar Confederation that wanted to dethrone King Stanisław August Poniatowski, who was backed by Russia. During the war, Pulaski served as a cavalry commander. He was forced to flee to Paris when the Russians won the war. It was in Paris where Pulaski met Benjamin Franklin, who encouraged Pulaski to join the Thirteen Colonies fighting in the American Revolutionary War against the Kingdom of Great Britain. Franklin wrote a letter of recommendation of Pulaski for George Washington.

Not long after Pulaski arrived in the colonies in 1777, he had a meeting with Washington, who was impressed by Pulaski and his military skills. Washington spoke with the Continental Congress, asking if Pulaski could lead the Continental Cavalry. Due to opposition by Congress, Pulaski worked with Washington as a volunteer aide instead. During the Battle of Brandywine in 1777, Pulaski was able to delay British forces long enough for Washington and his troops time to retreat. For his efforts, Congress promoted Pulaski to brigadier general of the cavalry.

He eventually became tired of the cavalry he commanded and, after speaking with Washington, formed the cavalry unit, Pulaski's Legion. Washington asked the legion to guard Charleston, South Carolina, and after seeing his talent, continental and French forces were impressed. He later fought with the colonial and French forces in Savannah, Georgia, where he was mortally wounded in 1779 during battle. For his services, Pulaski is known as the "Father of the American cavalry."

=== Memorial plans ===
In February 1903, Congress approved two statues being erected, one for Pulaski and another statue honoring Polish military hero Tadeusz Kościuszko. The allocation for each statue was $50,000. An Act of Congress authorized the two statues on February 27. The Pulaski statue would be located on Pennsylvania Avenue and the Kościuszko statue in Lafayette Square.

The sculptor hired to create the Pulaski statue, Kazimierz Chodziński, was at the request of Polish American groups. The architect chosen to assist with the statue was Albert Randolph Ross. The Gorham Manufacturing Company was hired as the founder and the Maine & New Hampshire Granite Company served as the contractor. In 1910, Congress authorized an additional $5,000 for the unveiling and dedication ceremony. Polish Americans were able to see both of the statue unveilings as the ceremonies occurred on the same day.

=== Dedication ===
A day before the unveiling and dedication ceremony, the Polish National Alliance received a cable from former President Theodore Roosevelt, who was in Berlin at the time, stating: "Accept my congratulations to all Americans of Polish birth or origin on the dedication of the monuments to the two great Polish heroes, Kościuszko and Pulaski, whose names will be forever associated on the honor role of American history." News of the message from Roosevelt spread quickly amongst the thousands of Poles and Polish Americans who had travelled to Washington, D.C., for the event.

The unveiling took place on May 11, 1910. The ceremony for the Kościuszko statue took place at 2:30pm and the one for Pulaski at 4pm. Prominent attendees included Secretary of War Jacob M. Dickinson, who delivered the keynote speech at the Pulaski ceremony, and President William Howard Taft, who spoke at both ceremonies. A Pulaski descendant, Francis Pulaski, who spoke at the second event, said "He brought to your shores his bravery and his military talents and offered them for the defense of your ideals and your independence."

Taft accepted both statues on behalf of the United States. Between the two events, the president and other officials watched an hour-long parade featuring thousands of people, including the entire District of Columbia National Guard and members from Polish societies. The ceremony at the Pulaski statue lasted around an hour and a banquet attended by Taft took place later that night at the Raleigh Hotel.

=== Later history ===
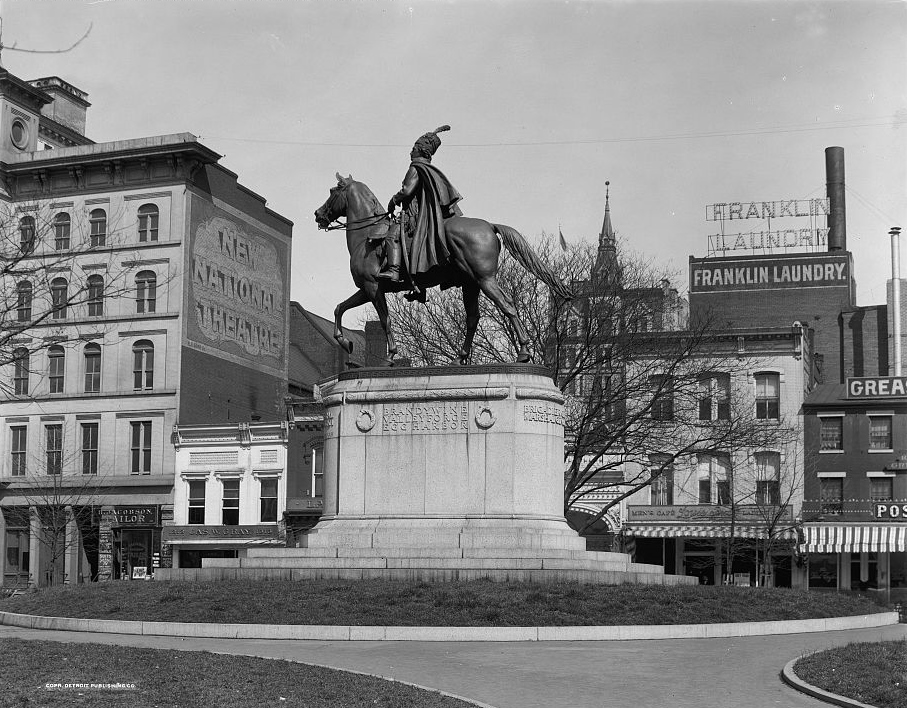
The statue in the 1920s

The statue was originally on a triangular park, Reservation 33, but was moved to another triangular park, Reservation 32, in 1931. It was moved back to its original location in 1958. The two reservations were merged in 1980 when Freedom Plaza opened.

The statue of Pulaski is one of 14 American Revolution statues that were collectively listed on the National Register of Historic Places (NRHP) on July 14, 1978. The following year the statues were added to the District of Columbia Inventory of Historic Sites. In addition, the Pulaski statue is a contributing property to the Pennsylvania Avenue National Historic Site, listed on the NRHP on October 15, 1966, and the L'Enfant Plan, listed on the NRHP on April 24, 1997.

== Location and design ==
The bronze Pulaski statue is located on the eastern side of Freedom Plaza, the city's Reservations 32 and 33, near the intersection of Pennsylvania Avenue and 13th Street NW in downtown Washington, D.C. It is 9-feet tall (2.7 m) and rests on a 12-foot tall (3.7 m), 15-foot long (4.6 m) marble base. Pulaski is riding a horse, which has its front right leg raised while trotting. Pulaski, dressed in his Polish military uniform as a cavalry commander, is wearing a long military coat and a decorative hat. He is holding onto the horse's reins while his feet are in the stirrups. The statue is resting on an oval base adorned with foliage and meandros. There are three steps surrounding the base.

=== Inscriptions ===
The inscriptions read:

Base, Left Side:

Brandy Wine
Valley Forge
Egg Harbor
(Base, Back Rounded End:)
Brigadier General US
Marshal General Poland

Base, Right Side:

Charlestown
Savannah
Germantown

Base, Front Rounded End:

Brigadier General
Casimir Pulaski
1741–1779
Fell in Battle at Savannah

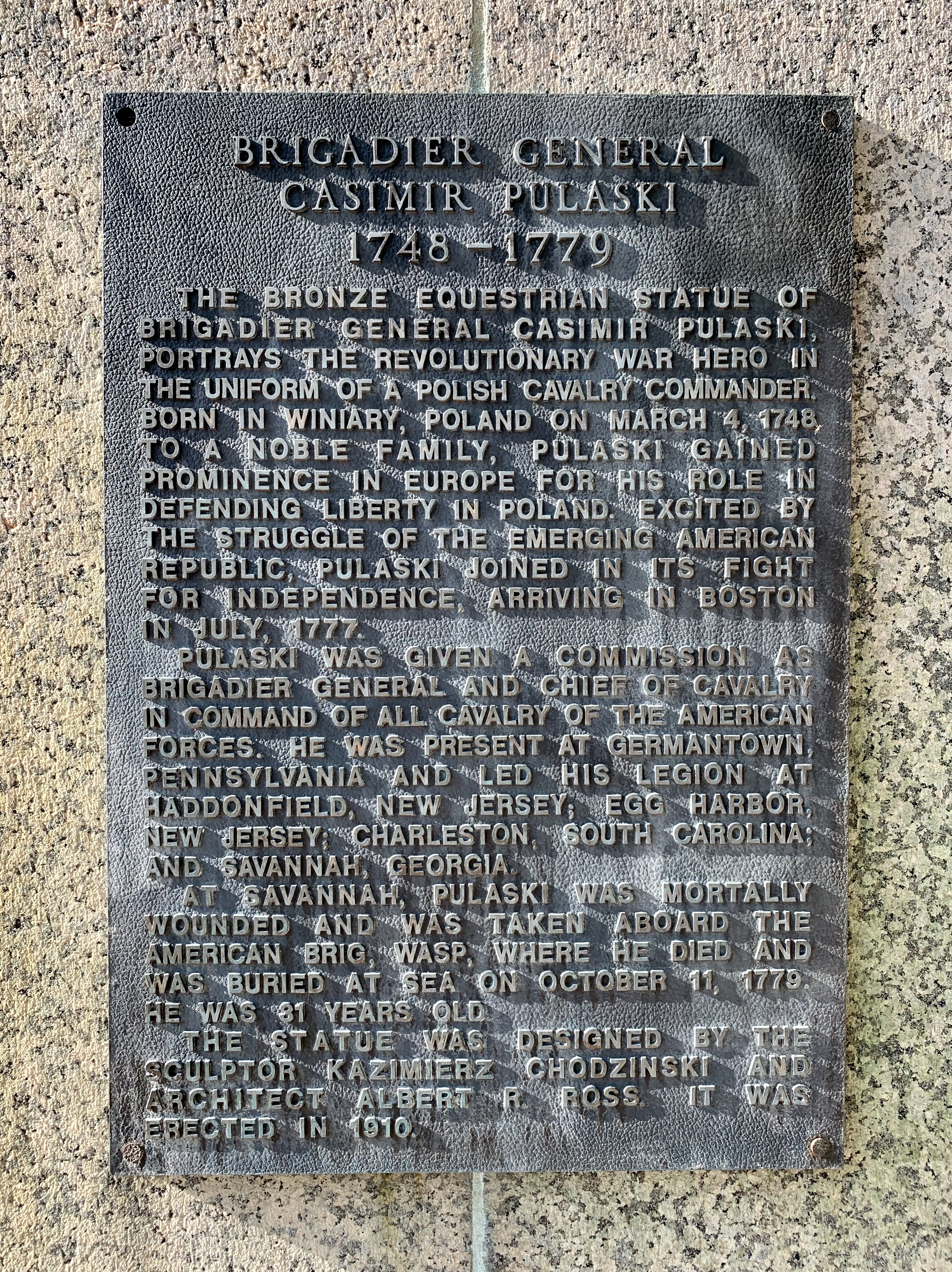
The plaque on the statue's base

Base Plaque:

Brigadier General
Casimir Pulaski
1748-1779
The Bronze Equestrian Statue of
Brigadier General Casimir Pulaski,
Portrays the Revolutionary War Hero In
The Uniform of a Polish Cavalry Commander.
Born in Wniary, Poland on March 4, 1748
To a Noble Family, Pulaski Gained
Prominence in Europe for His Role In
Defending Liberty in Poland. Excited By
The Struggle of the Emerging American
Republic, Pulaski Joined in Its Fight
For Independence, Arriving in Boston
In July, 1777.
Pulaski Was given a Commission As
Brigadier General and Chief of Cavalry
In Command of All Cavalry of the American
Forces. He Was Present at Germantown,
Pennsylvania and Led His Legion At
Haddonfield, New Jersey; Egg Harbor,
New Jersey; Charleston, South Carolina;
And Savannah, Georgia.
At Savannah, Pulaski Was Mortally
Wounded and Was Taken Aboard The
American Brig, Wasp, Where He Died And
Was Buried at Sea, on October 11, 1779.
He Was 31 Years Old.
The Statue Was Designed by The
Sculptor Kazimierz Chodzinski And
Architect Albert R. Ross. It Was
Erected in 1910.

== See also ==
- Casimir Pulaski Monument (Savannah, Georgia)
- List of public art in Washington, D.C., Ward 6
- National Register of Historic Places in Washington, D.C.
- Outdoor sculpture in Washington, D.C.
