= Shakan Island =

Island in Alaska

Coordinates: 56°08′54″N 133°38′04″W

Shakan Island is an island in Alaska off the northern coast of Kosciusko Island near the southern coastline of Shakan Bay. Its name was published by the United States Coast and Geodetic Survey in 1883.
