= Kazimierz Chodziński =

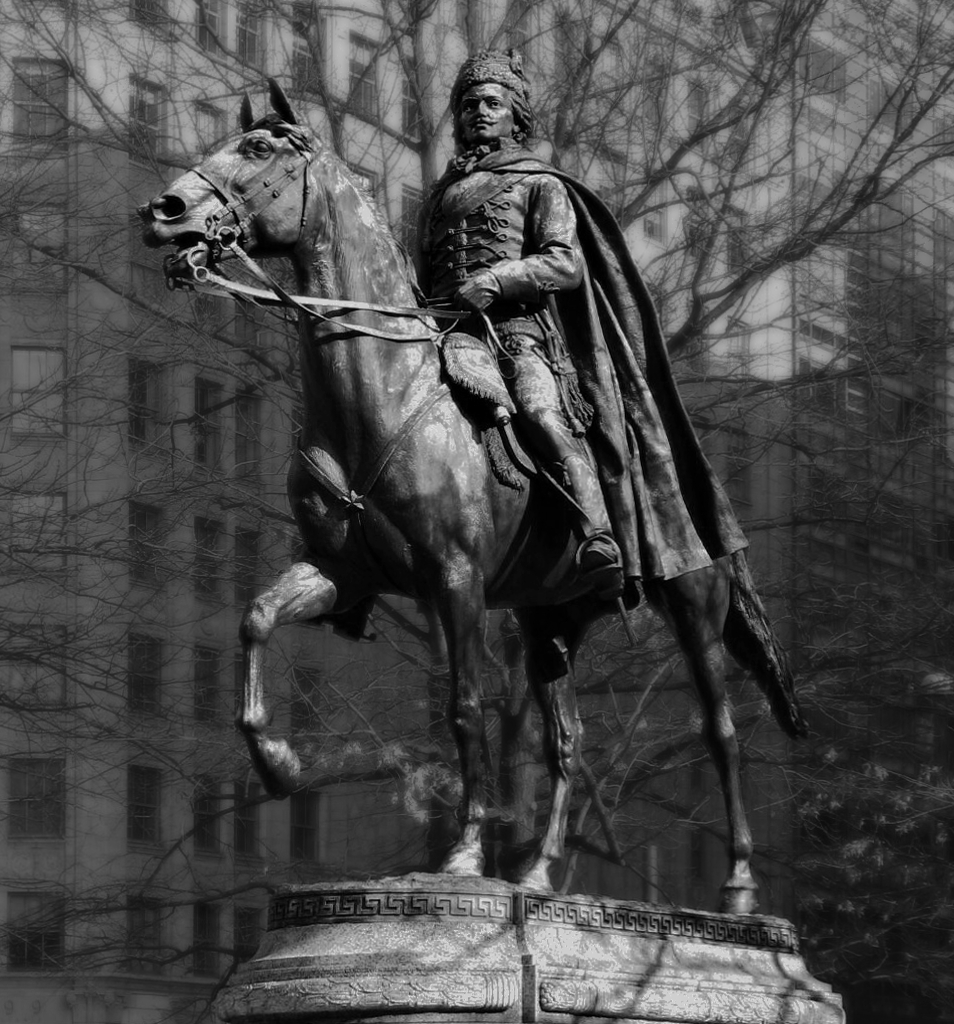
General Casimir Pulaski in Washington, one of Chodziński's most famous works

Kazimierz Chodziński (Casimir) (1861 – 1919 or 1921) was a Polish sculptor, and a student of Jan Matejko academy in Kraków. He sculpted over a hundred different statues in partitioned Poland, as well as some other European cities, such as Vienna. Around 1903–1910 he worked in the United States, where he designed, among others, the Tadeusz Kościuszko statue in Chicago and the General Casimir Pulaski statue in Washington, DC.

== Biography ==
Kazimierz Chodziński was born in 1861 in Łańcut, Austrian Empire. His father was a painter. Chodziński worked as an artist, painting and sculpting, gathering resources that allowed him to enroll in Kraków School of Fine Arts in Austrian partition of Poland and study under the sculptor Walery Gadomski and the famous painter Jan Matejko. As a student, he won an art competition, sold his first serious work ("Egyptian Woman" ), and around 1881, obtained a government scholarship to study at the Academy of Fine Arts in Vienna under Edmund von Hellmer. He received a number of other awards and scholarships, finishing his studies in 1887.

Afterward he returned to Kraków, where he opened a studio specializing in sculptures for religious and monumental buildings. Later, he moved his studio to Warsaw (capital of the Congress Poland), due to better conditions for exporting his work.

Around 1903–1910 he worked in the United States. His designs from that period include the Tadeusz Kościuszko statue in Chicago – originally placed in Humboldt Park, and later moved to what is now the city's lakeside Museum Campus – and the General Casimir Pulaski statue in Washington, DC's Freedom Plaza.

Chodziński died in 1919 in Lviv (Lwów), then in the newly independent Second Polish Republic.

== Selected works ==
Some of his most famous works include: "Egyptian Woman," "Old Man," "Boy," "Dancing Faun," "Joyous Life," "Lord of the World," "Czesnik and Regent," "Boy's Head," "Girl's Head," "Readying for the Ball," "Praying Prisoner".
