= Edna Bay, Alaska =

City in Alaska, United States

Edna Bay
- Second class city
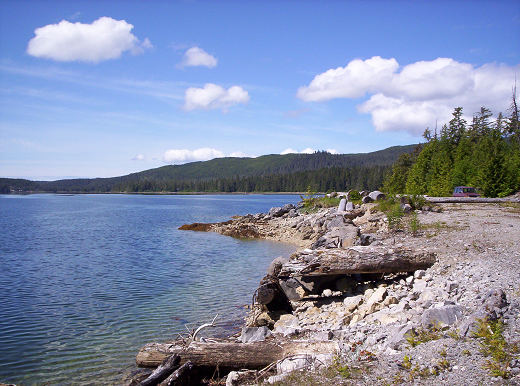
- Edna Bay

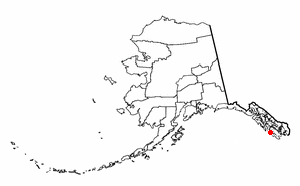
- Location of Edna Bay, Alaska
- Coordinates: 55°58′43″N 133°40′35″W
- Country: United States
- State: Alaska
- Incorporated: October 13, 2014

Government
  - Mayor: Tyler Poelstra
  - State senator: Bert Stedman (R)
  - State rep.: Rebecca Himschoot (I)

Area
  - Total: 24.21 sq mi (62.71 km^{2})
  - Land: 21.15 sq mi (54.77 km^{2})
  - Water: 3.07 sq mi (7.94 km^{2})
- Elevation: 13 ft (4 m)

Population (2020)
  - Total: 25
  - Density: 1.2/sq mi (0.46/km^{2})
- Time zone: UTC-9 (Alaska (AKST))
  - Summer (DST): UTC-8 (AKDT)
- ZIP code: 99950
- Area code: 907
- FIPS code: 02-20970
- GNIS feature ID: 1421658
- Website: www.ednabayalaska.net

Edna Bay is a city on Kosciusko Island in the unorganized borough, and for census purposes in the Prince of Wales-Hyder Census Area in the U.S. state of Alaska. The community was officially incorporated on October 13, 2014, and has a population of 51 permanent residents and 12 part-time residents as of January 2024.

Edna Bay is the only populated town on Kosciusko Island, and has both year-round and part-time residents. Year-round residents are either retired or work primarily in the fishing and logging industries. Some permanent residents also work seasonally off-island in various industries. Due to the very remote location of Edna Bay and the subsequent difficulty and expense of traveling between Edna Bay and larger Southeast Alaska communities, subsistence hunting, fishing, and gathering comprise a large portion of the livelihood activities for residents of Edna Bay.

== Geography ==
Edna Bay is located at 55°58′43″N 133°40′35″W (55.978539, -133.676356).

According to the United States Census Bureau, the city of Edna Bay has a total area of 58.8 square miles (152 km^{2}), of which, 56.0 square miles (145 km^{2}) of it is land and 2.8 square miles (7.3 km^{2}) of it (4.80%) is water.

== Demographics ==
Historical population
Census	Pop.	Note	%±
1950	41		—
1960	135		229.3%
1970	112		−17.0%
1990	86		—
2000	49		−43.0%
2010	42		−14.3%
2020	25		−40.5%
U.S. Decennial Census

Edna Bay first appeared on the 1950 U.S. Census as an unincorporated village. It appeared again in 1960 and 1970, but did not appear on the 1980 census. In 1990, it was made a census-designated place (CDP). It formally incorporated in 2014.

=== 2020 census ===
As of the 2020 census, Edna Bay had a population of 25. The median age was 59.2 years. 8.0% of residents were under the age of 18 and 28.0% of residents were 65 years of age or older. For every 100 females there were 150.0 males, and for every 100 females age 18 and over there were 155.6 males age 18 and over.

0.0% of residents lived in urban areas, while 100.0% lived in rural areas.

There were 12 households in Edna Bay, of which 25.0% had children under the age of 18 living in them. Of all households, 16.7% were married-couple households, 75.0% were households with a male householder and no spouse or partner present, and 8.3% were households with a female householder and no spouse or partner present. About 66.6% of all households were made up of individuals and 16.6% had someone living alone who was 65 years of age or older.

There were 60 housing units, of which 80.0% were vacant. The homeowner vacancy rate was 32.0% and the rental vacancy rate was 0.0%.

Racial composition as of the 2020 census
Race	Number	Percent
White	23	92.0%
Black or African American	0	0.0%
American Indian and Alaska Native	0	0.0%
Asian	0	0.0%
Native Hawaiian and Other Pacific Islander	0	0.0%
Some other race	0	0.0%
Two or more races	2	8.0%
Hispanic or Latino (of any race)	0	0.0%

=== 2000 census ===
As of the census of 2000, there were 49 people, 19 households, and 14 families residing in the city. The population density was 0.9 inhabitants per square mile (0.35/km^{2}). There were 40 housing units at an average density of 0.7 per square mile (0.27/km^{2}). The racial makeup of the city was 95.92% White, and 4.08% from two or more races.

There were 19 households, out of which 36.8% had children under the age of 18 living with them, 63.2% were married couples living together, and 26.3% were non-families. 26.3% of all households were made up of individuals, and 10.5% had someone living alone who was 65 years of age or older. The average household size was 2.58 and the average family size was 3.14.

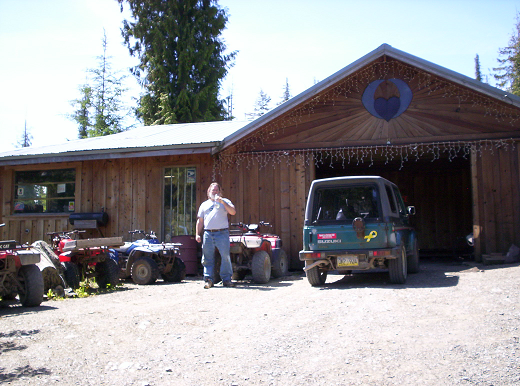
Edna Bay Alaska general store and post office, summer 2006

In the city the population was spread out, with 28.6% under the age of 18, 6.1% from 18 to 24, 18.4% from 25 to 44, 40.8% from 45 to 64, and 6.1% who were 65 years of age or older. The median age was 37 years. For every 100 females, there were 157.9 males. For every 100 females age 18 and over, there were 133.3 males.

The median income for a household in the city was $44,583, and the median income for a family was $49,063. Males had a median income of $40,625 versus $0 for females. The per capita income for the city was $58,967. There were 15.4% of families and 23.1% of the population living below the poverty line, including 29.4% of under eighteens and 50.0% of those over 64.

== Economy ==
As of 2007, Edna Bay hosts a combined general store and post office, an Alliance Christian church, several sawmills, and two licensed building contractors. There is a small state-owned marina and float-plane dock which are unattended (self-service). At present there are cabin rentals. Visitors to Edna Bay without a local contact would be well advised to bring with them everything needed for remote outdoor survival, although food and a limited selection of non-food supplies can be purchased at the general store located approximately 3 miles by road from the marina. The general store and post office is open from 2PM to 4PM Tuesdays through Saturdays. Most land in and around Edna Bay is privately held and there are no public camping or day-use facilities. Unescorted visitors should first check with the local residents before attempting to trespass, camp, or hunt in the area.

Residents of Edna Bay have both landline telephone and broadband internet. Cellular phone service in Edna Bay is rare and intermittent. There is one outdoor public phone (at the marina inside the access ramp). rent service brought to the community by the State of Alaska and AP&T.
