= Kosciusko, Texas =

Kosciusko
- Unincorporated community
- Location in Texas and the United States Kosciusko (the United States)
- Coordinates: 29°06′20″N 97°57′02″W
- Country: United States
- State: Texas
- County: Wilson
- Elevation: 367 ft (112 m)

Population (2009)
  - Total: 390
- Time zone: UTC-6 (Central (CST))
  - Summer (DST): UTC-5 (CDT)
- GNIS feature ID: 1360752

Kosciusko (/ˌkɒsiˈʌskoʊ/ KOSS-ee-USK-oh) is an unincorporated community in Wilson County, Texas, United States. In 2009, it was inhabited by 390 people.

== Etymology ==
The settlement was named after Tadeusz Kościuszko, a military general of Polish origin, who served in the Continental Army during the American Revolution. Kosciusko is the anglicisation of his name.

== History ==
=== Early history ===
The town of Kosciusko was founded on March 12, 1880 in Wilson County, Texas when approximately 65 Polish families moved north from the neighboring town of Cestohowa in search of better farm land. The area they settled was previously known as "Little Egypt" and had been settled by a small handful of German families circa 1850.

The first school established in the town of Kosciusko was St. Ann's School - a Catholic school established in 1892. This one-room school was run by the Sisters of Charity of the Incarnate Word. The school was added on and expanded over the years before closing in 1968.

In 1896, a U.S. Post Office was established in the town of Kosciusko, inside the new general store named the Red and White Store, later known as the Farmer's General Store. At this time, there were approximately four businesses located in Kosciusko, including a blacksmith, meat market, and garage. The post office remained open until 1920, when rural delivery was made available. The Farmer's General Store closed in 1967.

In 1898, the first church for St. Ann's Parish was erected. The first church was a wooden structure measuring 40x80 feet.

=== A growing community ===
In 1934, electricity arrived to the town of Kosciusko, allowing homes to be hooked-up for a cost of $5. At this time Kosciusko had a population of 700 people, the vast majority of whom were located in the surrounding farms and ranches. In 1935, State Highway 123 began construction, connecting Kosciusko with other areas of the state. At this time, Pruski Store was constructed along the highway. The store was torn down in 1972.

In 1937, a cotton gin was built called Farmer's Gin Company. The gin was located across the road from the Kosciusko Community Hall. The gin remained active until 1953.

Kosciusko hit its peak population in the late 1940s, with a total population of approximately 950 people in both the town and surrounding farms and ranches. As farming became less profitable, many people began to leave the community in search of employment in the city of San Antonio and surrounding small towns.

=== Today ===
By the 1980s, Kosciusko's population had declined to around 400 people. The population remains about the same today. The vast majority of Kosciusko's current inhabitants trace their lineage back to the original founding families.

Today the town consists of St. Ann's Catholic Church - a painted church, St. Ann's Cemetery, Kosciusko Hall - a dance hall, a gas station and fertilizer company, the local water supply corporation, a plumbing company, a concrete plant, as well as numerous farms and ranches. Kosciusko remains an active community, known for its annual picnic - always celebrated the first weekend of August.

== St. Ann's Catholic Church ==
=== Early years ===
On October 27, 1898, with the help of the men of the town, the first Catholic Church was dedicated to St. Ann. It was a wooden structure, and cost $2,000 in materials, with donations in labor, and measured 80 by 40 feet. It had a beautiful hand carved wooden altar, and was built facing to the west, the opposite of the current church today.

In 1909, St. Ann’s had 445 parishioners, and 77 children in the school. Also at this time, St. Mary’s Catholic Church in Stockdale was a mission on Kosciusko.

In 1933 the church was lengthened by 20 feet, and 5 more pews were added to each side of the church. The steeple was also lowered and the entire church received a new coat of paint.

=== A Growing Parish ===
In 1934, St. Ann’s had 701 parishioners, and 105 students at the school. Also in 1934, electricity came to Kosciusko, and electric lighting was installed in the church. In 1935, a new rectory was built on the south side of the church, where the southern breeze would provide better cooling. Also electricity was installed in the convent, and a new school house was built. In 1936, the reed (pump) organ that was used in the choir was replaced with a Wicks Fuga pipe organ.

=== A New Sanctuary ===
In 1941 a building fund was started for the building of a new and larger church, as the parish had far outgrown the original wooden church.

In 1948 the parish had 858 parishioners, and the parish celebrated its 50th anniversary.

In March 1951 the construction of the new church was completed. It cost $117,000 excluding furnishings. It is a modified Gothic design with a 70 foot high bell tower. The church is 127 feet long by 59 feet wide and holds 450 people. The church has a hand poured terrazzo floor, very expensive for a rural church.

=== A Painted Church ===
In 1973 the parish celebrated its 75th anniversary. At this time the stained glass windows were installed. The stained glass was created using a technique known as faceted glass.

In 1998, in preparation for the Centennial Celebration, the wooden stained glass doors were installed at the entrance of the church. Chandeliers were also hung above the center aisle.

In 2007 the interior of the church was remodeled, and painted by Polish Artist Cezary Sienkiel. Over the altar is now a beautiful painting of St. Ann. The church walls and portions of the ceiling were also painted. It is identified today as one of the Painted Polish Churches of South Texas.

== St. Ann's Catholic School ==
=== Early years ===
The first school established in the town of Kosciusko was St. Ann's School - a Catholic school established in 1892. This one-room school was run by the Sisters of Charity of the Incarnate Word. In 1918 a convent was built for the Sisters of Charity of the Incarnate Word, and another room was added to the schoolhouse.

=== Catholic Public School ===
In 1934, St. Ann's School became part of the public school system, while remaining under the direction of the Sisters of Charity. In 1937 a high school was built, and the gymnasium was converted into the community hall. The following year, in 1938, a school auditorium was built, as well as a new mess hall for the picnic grounds. In 1948 Kosciusko’s school became accredited as Kosciusko Junior High School. The high school juniors and seniors attended school in Poth.

=== The Final Years ===
In 1968 the school in Kosciusko sent 7th grade and older students to attend school in Poth. By 1969 the school in Kosciusko was closed, and all students attended school in Poth. The Sisters of Charity of the Incarnate Word were moved, and the convent was sold. Nothing remains of the original school to this day.

== Kosciusko Red Sox ==
Aside from the Church, School, and Community Hall, Kosciusko was also well known for its local Baseball team - the Kosciusko Red Sox. The team was composed of local men who played in the small town bluebonnet league. The baseball team was well known in the surrounding communities. It was not uncommon to have a baseball game with over 1,500 people in attendance.
