= Thaddeus Kosciusko Bridge =

Twin-span arch bridge between Colonie and Halfmoon, New York, USA

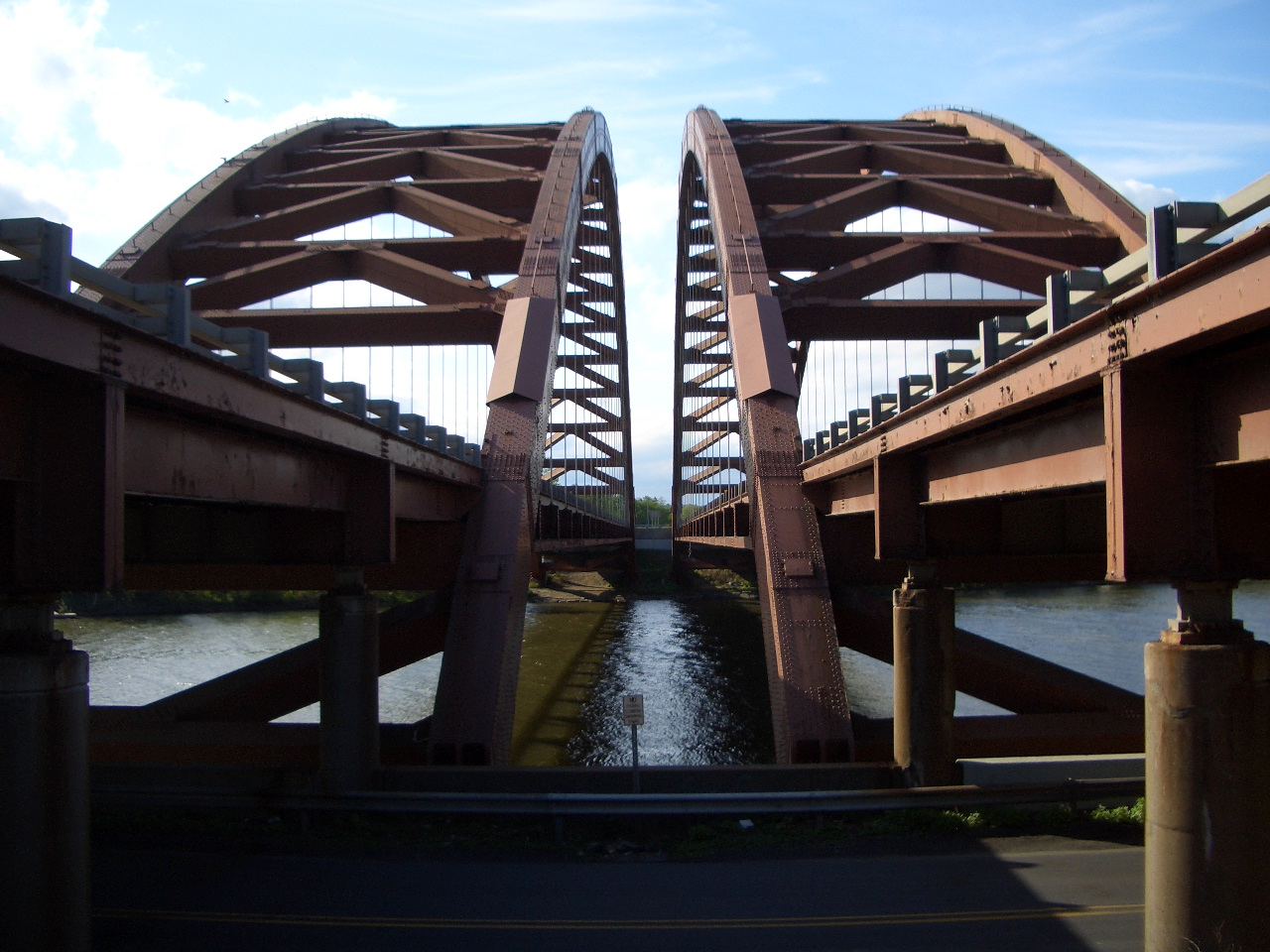
- The bridge in 2007
- Coordinates: 42.79152°N 73.76146°W
- Carries: 6 lanes of I-87
- Crosses: Mohawk River
- Locale: Halfmoon and Colonie, New York
- Other name(s): The Twin Bridges, The Twins
- Maintained by: New York State Department of Transportation
- ID number: 4033181, 4033182

Characteristics
- Design: Twin through arch bridges

History
- Opened: 1959

Statistics
- Daily traffic: 115,000 vehicles (average weekday)

Location
- Interactive map of Thaddeus Kosciusko Bridge

The Thaddeus Kosciusko Bridge, commonly referred to as the Twin Bridges, is a pair of identical through arch, steel bridges which span the Mohawk River between the towns of Colonie, Albany County and Halfmoon, Saratoga County, in New York State's Capital District. The northbound and the southbound spans each carry three lanes of Interstate 87 between exits 7 and 8. The toll-free bridge opened in 1959 as part of the Adirondack Northway, a 176-mile (283 km) highway linking Albany and the Canada–United States border at Champlain. The Interstate 87 section of the highway was formally inaugurated by Governor Nelson Rockefeller on May 26, 1961.

The bridge is named (using an anglicized form) in honor of Tadeusz Kościuszko (1746–1817), the preeminent national figure in Poland's fight for independence. Kościuszko arrived in Colonial America a month after the July 4, 1776 Declaration of Independence and remained a notable military leader throughout the Revolutionary War, attaining the rank of general as well as honorary American citizenship. He returned to Poland in July 1784.

The decks on both sides of the bridge were replaced in the spring of 2013.

== Gallery ==
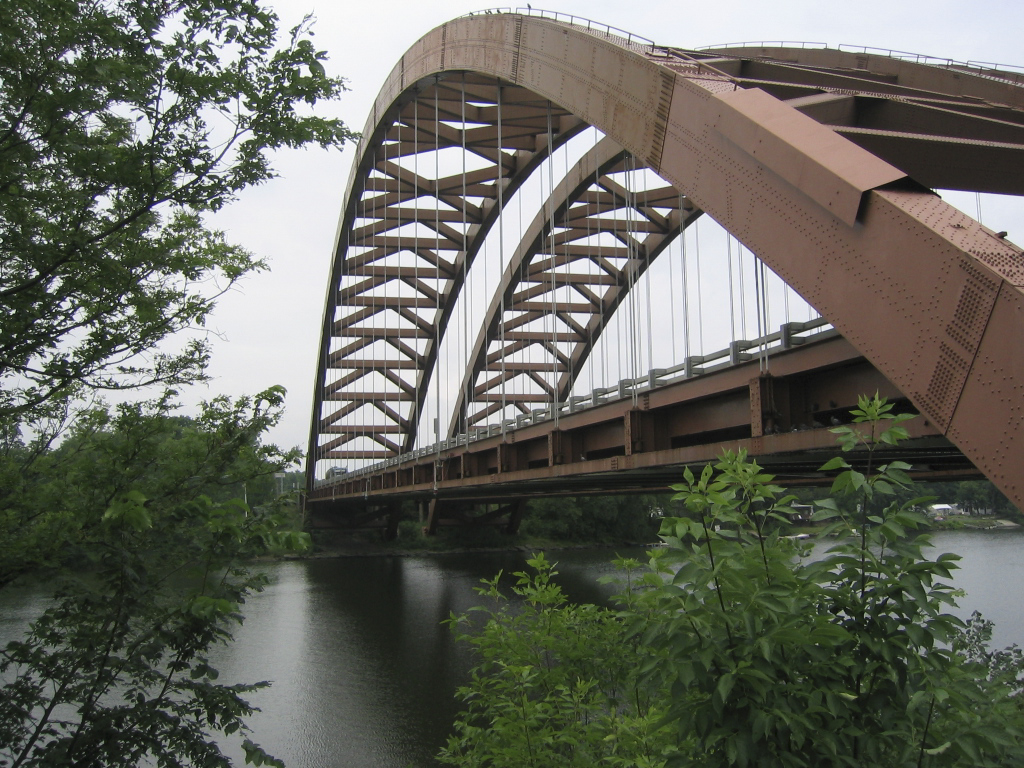
The bridge from land

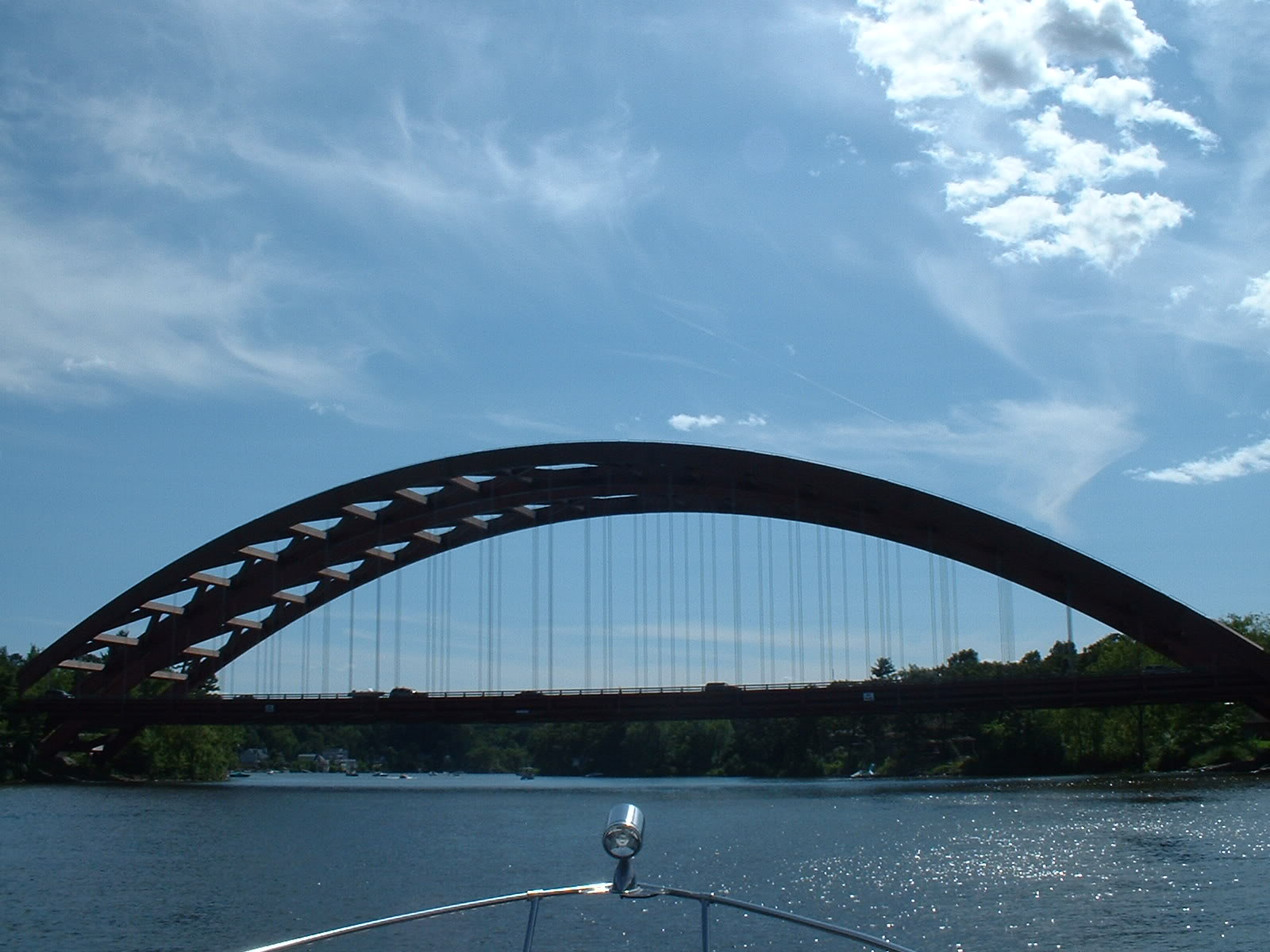
The view from the Mohawk River

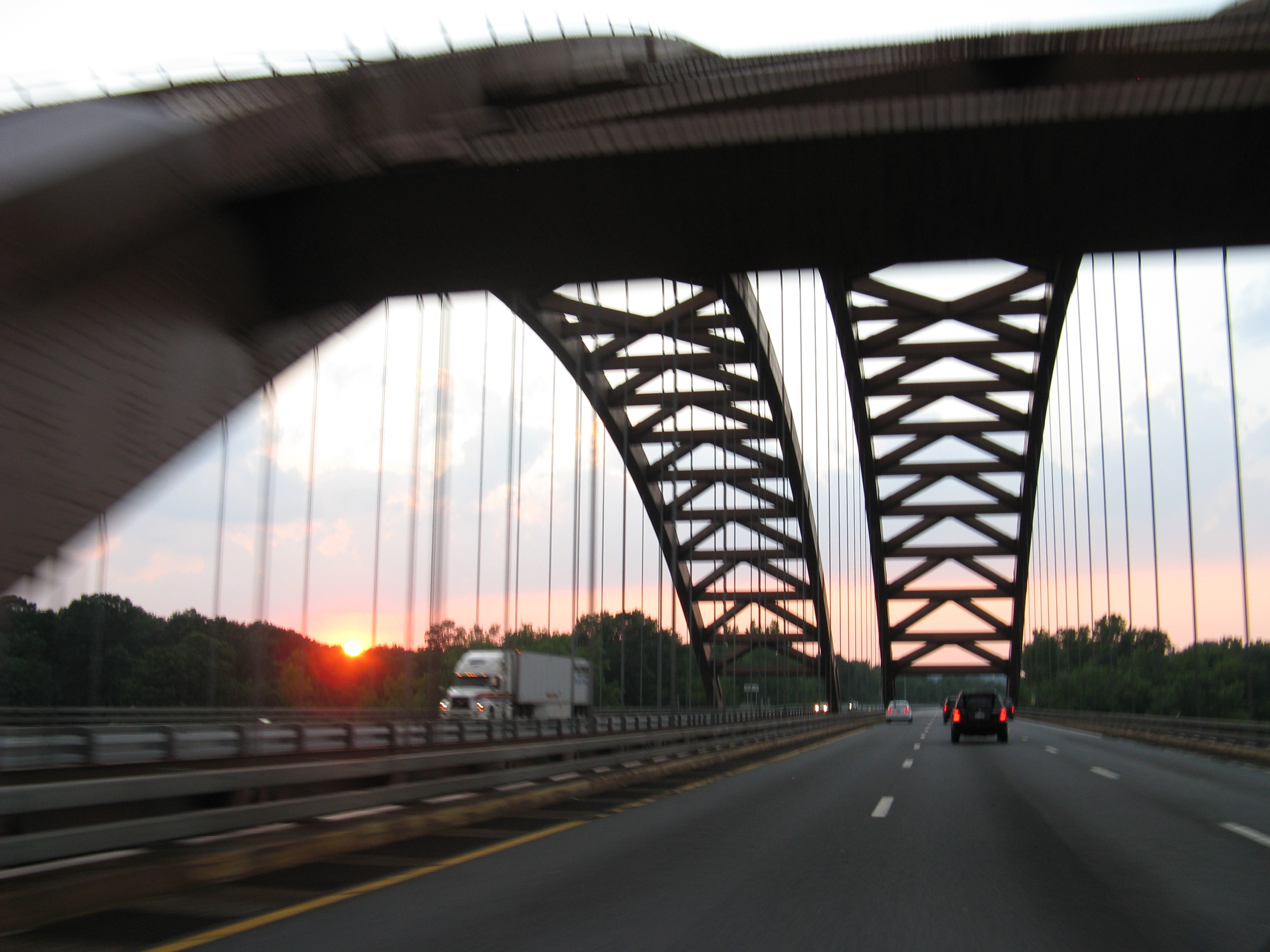
Deck of the bridge

== See also ==
- Kosciuszko Bridge
