= Thaddeus Kosciuszko National Memorial =

U.S. National Memorial in Philadelphia, Pennsylvania

- U.S. National Register of Historic Places
- U.S. National Memorial
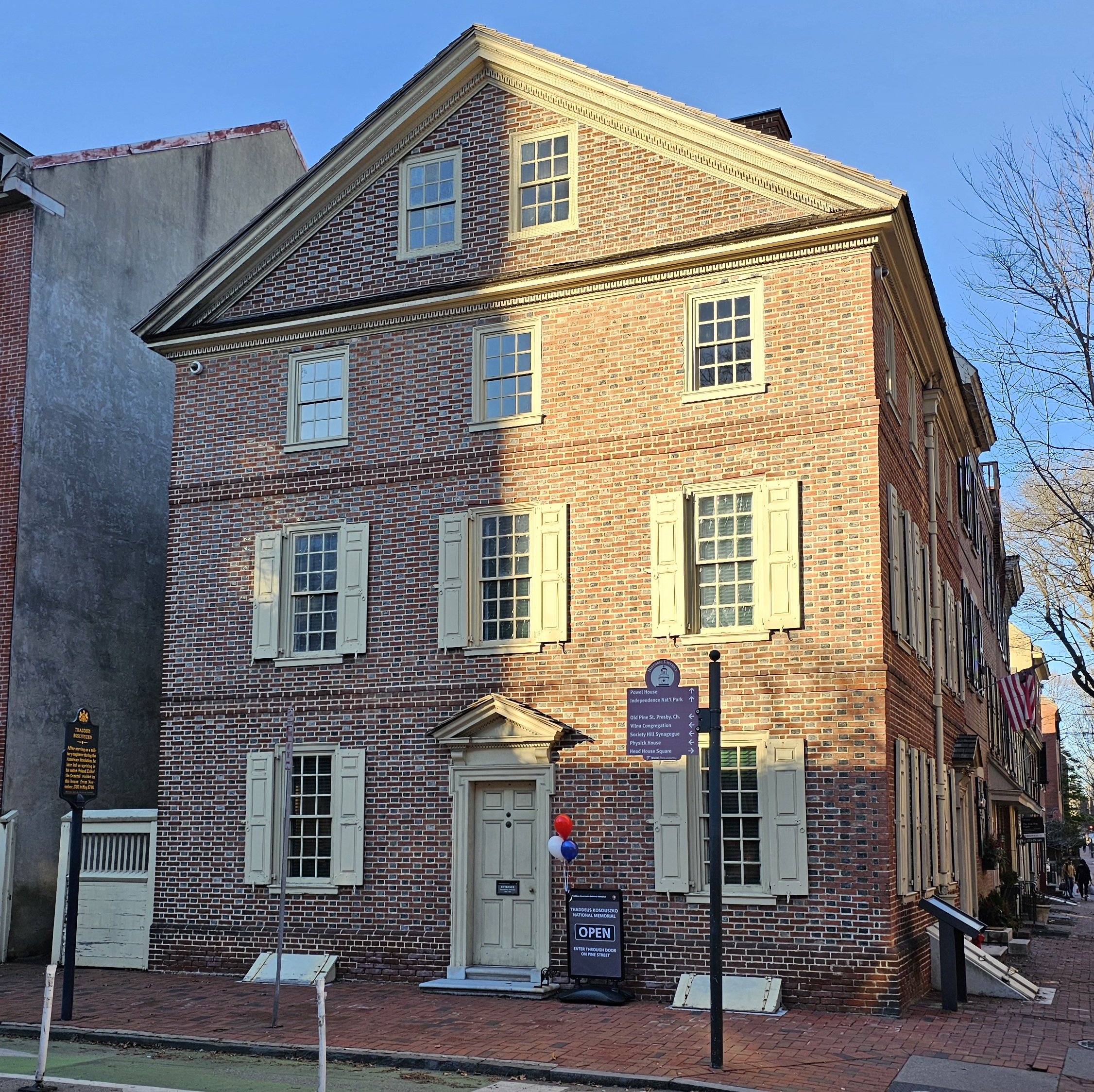
- The building in 2024

- Location within Philadelphia Location within Pennsylvania Location within the United States
- Location: 301 Pine St. Philadelphia, Pennsylvania
- Coordinates: 39.943438°N 75.147276°W
- Area: 0.02 acres (0.0081 ha)
- Built: 1775
- Architect: Joseph Few
- Visitation: 4,107 (2005)
- Website: Thaddeus Kosciuszko National Memorial
- NRHP reference No.: 70000068
- Added to NRHP: December 18, 1970

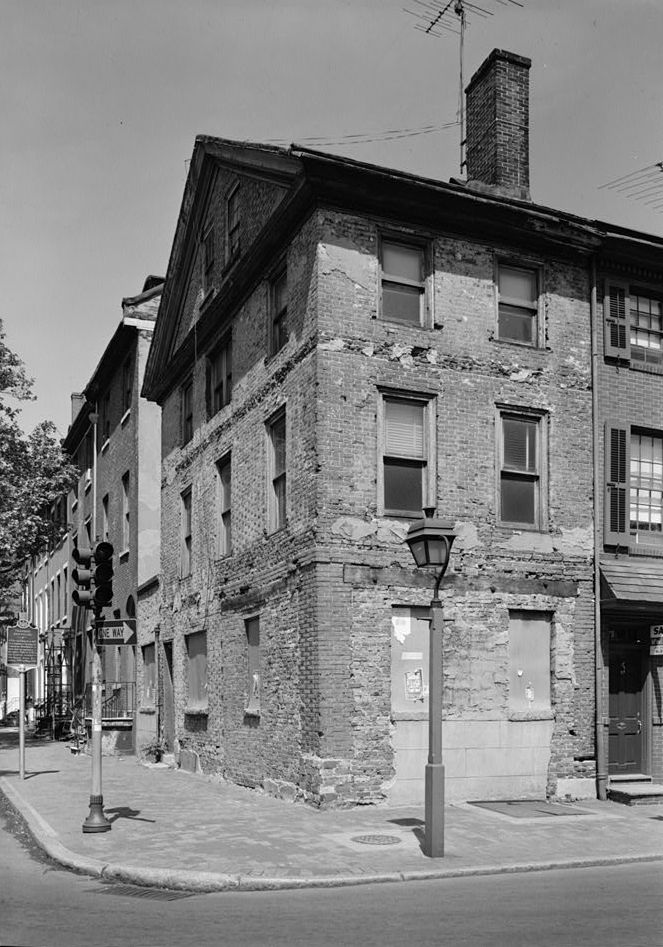
Thaddeus Kosciuszko House in May 1972, prior to its restoration

Thaddeus Kosciuszko National Memorial preserves the home of Tadeusz (Thaddeus) Kościuszko at 301 Pine Street in Philadelphia, Pennsylvania. The life and work of the Polish patriot and hero of the American Revolution are commemorated here.

Kosciuszko returned to the United States in August 1797 to a hero's welcome after his wounding, capture, imprisonment, and banishment from his native Poland, which was partitioned by three neighbouring powers. Kosciuszko's secretary, Julian Ursyn Niemcewicz, having been instructed to find "a dwelling as small, as remote, and as cheap" as possible, chose Mrs. Ann Relf's boarding house at the corner of 3rd and Pine Streets in Society Hill. Here, where Kosciuszko recuperated from his wounds while rarely leaving the house, he was visited by numerous luminaries of the day, including Vice President Thomas Jefferson, architect Benjamin Latrobe, Supreme Court Justice William Paterson, Chief Little Turtle of the Miami people, and Chief Joseph Brant of the Mohawk nation. He returned to Europe the following June to support the restoration of a divided Poland.

The home was listed on the National Register of Historic Places on December 18, 1970. The national memorial was authorized on October 21, 1972. It is administered under Independence National Historical Park but is counted as a separate unit of the National Park System. At 0.02 acres (0.0081 ha; 870 ft^{2}; 81 m^{2}), the memorial is America's smallest unit of the National Park System.

The second floor bedroom where Kosciuszko stayed has been restored to how it may have looked during his residence. The site is open for tours on Saturdays and Sundays from 12:00 noon to 4:00 p.m., April through October. Admission is free.

== See also ==
- List of national memorials of the United States
- National Register of Historic Places listings in Center City, Philadelphia
