= Kosciuszko Park (Chicago) =

Public park and historic fieldhouse in Chicago, Illinois

- Kosciuszko Park Field House
- U.S. National Register of Historic Places
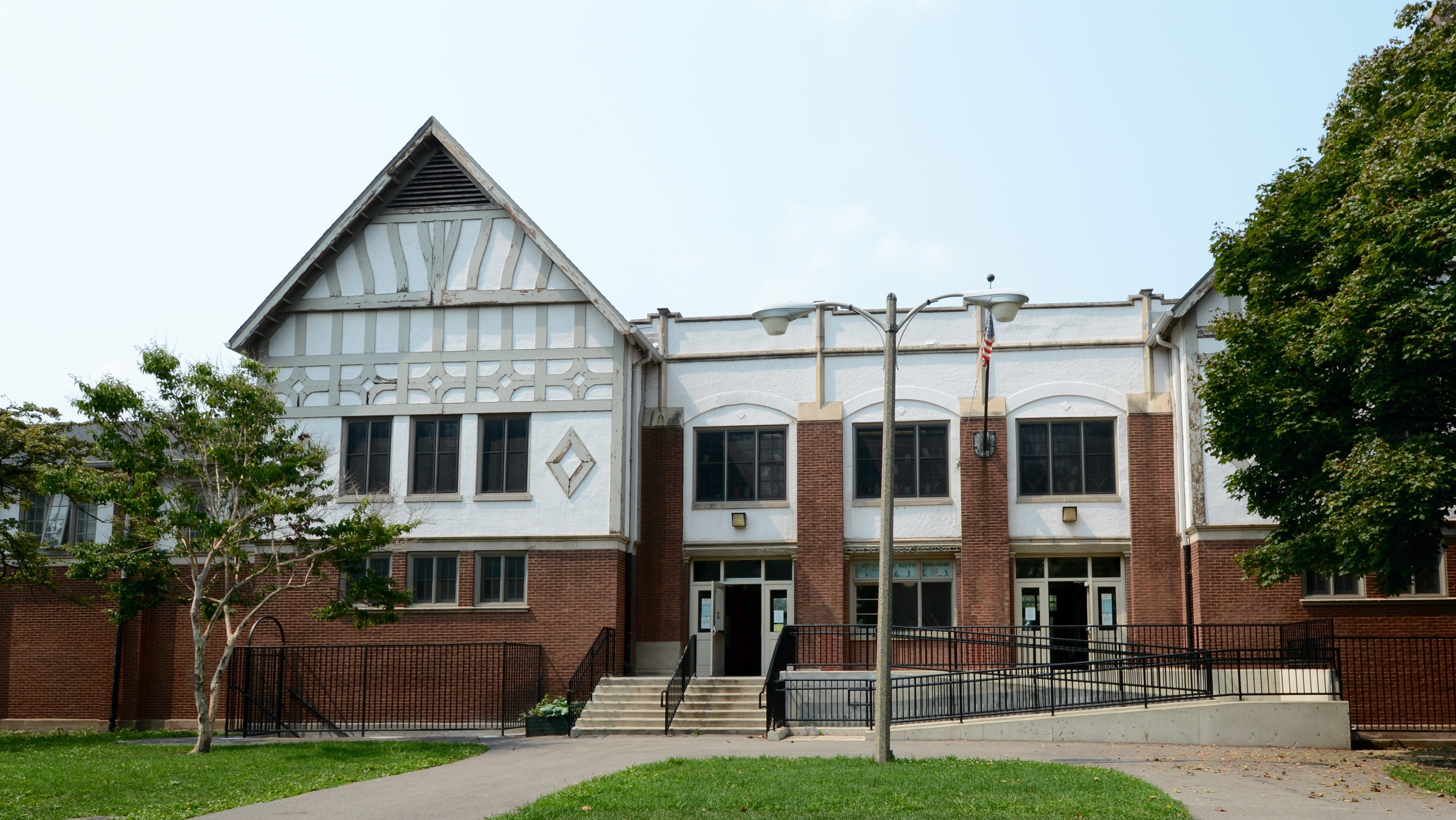
- The fieldhouse, viewed from the park

- Location within Chicago metropolitan area Location within Illinois Location within the United States
- Location: 2732 N. Avers Ave., Chicago, Illinois
- Coordinates: 41°55′51″N 87°43′26″W
- Area: less than one acre
- Built: 1914–1916
- Architect: Albert A. Schwartz; Frederick W. Bowes
- Architectural style: Tudor Revival
- MPS: Chicago Park District MPS
- NRHP reference No.: 13000830
- Added to NRHP: October 16, 2013

Kosciuszko Park is a 9.01-acre (3.65 ha) public park at 2732 North Avers Avenue in Logan Square on Chicago's Northwest Side. Its northern boundary meets Diversey Avenue, and its western boundary is one block east of Pulaski Road. Operated by the Chicago Park District, the park includes a fieldhouse, an indoor pool, athletic fields and courts, and an accessible playground.

The Northwest Park District acquired and named the site in 1914, and the park was formally dedicated in 1916. Its Tudor Revival fieldhouse, designed by Albert A. Schwartz and completed under Frederick W. Bowes, is the principal surviving feature of the original design. The fieldhouse was listed on the National Register of Historic Places on October 16, 2013, for its local significance in architecture, recreation, and social history.

From its opening, the fieldhouse served as an athletic, educational, and cultural center. It housed a branch of the Chicago Public Library and one of Chicago's earliest Polish-language schools, and later provided language and citizenship classes to immigrants. Although the park itself is in Logan Square, it also gave its name to a neighborhood extending into Avondale.

== History ==
The Northwest Park District was formed on June 30, 1911, to serve a rapidly developing part of Chicago that was distant from the city's older park systems. On March 20, 1914, its commissioners resolved to acquire land for a site initially called Park No. 2. Between April and July, the district purchased six tracts between Diversey, Avers, Harding, and Schubert avenues, totaling 8.06 acres (3.26 ha). It officially named the site Kosciuszko Park on June 22 in honor of Tadeusz Kościuszko, the Polish military leader who served in the American Revolutionary War and led the Kościuszko Uprising of 1794. Intervening streets were vacated in 1916 to enlarge the park property.

The park district hired Henry J. Stockman to design the landscape and Albert A. Schwartz to design the fieldhouse in October 1914. Construction began that month. After the district replaced Schwartz with Frederick W. Bowes in April 1915, Bowes retained Schwartz's exterior design while revising interior plans and building systems. The completed fieldhouse initially also served as the Northwest Park District's headquarters. The park's formal dedication on July 4, 1916, included athletic meets, a band concert, contests, and fireworks organized with local improvement associations.

Kosciuszko became part of the Chicago Park District when the city's 22 independent park districts were consolidated in 1934. The fieldhouse was expanded with an assembly hall in 1936, and a fire in 1953 required repairs to its roof, walls, windows, and second-floor clubrooms. The Park District added a natatorium in the 1980s. Accessibility work in 2010 and 2011 added an elevator, lifts, and exterior ramps, while other work replaced windows and the roof and repaired masonry. Later projects included fieldhouse and artificial-turf improvements completed in 2019 and new or rehabilitated turf, playground, spray, and dog-friendly facilities completed in 2021.

== Fieldhouse and facilities ==
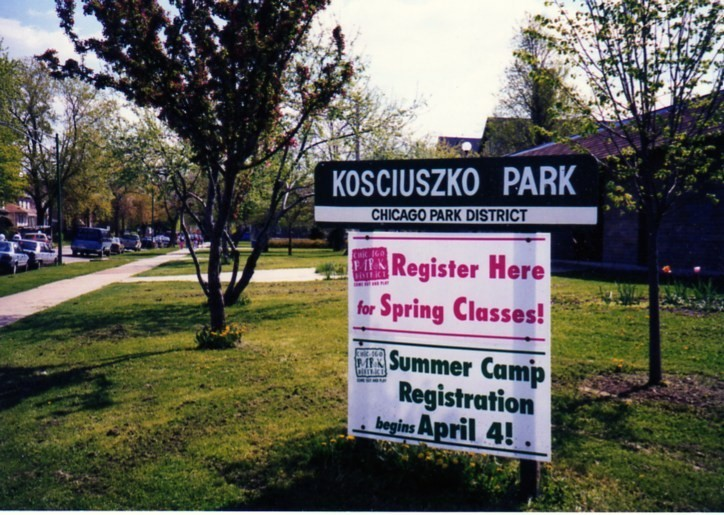
Kosciuszko Park grounds

The fieldhouse is a rectangular, two-and-a-half-story Tudor Revival building constructed of red brick, cast stone, and stucco. A flat-roofed central pavilion is flanked by two cross-gabled outer pavilions and adjoining wings. The outer pavilions have stucco upper stories with decorative half-timbering, while cast-stone trim, brick pilasters, and a crenellated parapet ornament the central pavilion. The interior retains its central lobby and much of the historical floor plan; it contains a gymnasium, an auditorium, offices, a kitchen, multipurpose rooms, and clubrooms.

The original landscape designed by Stockman has lost most of its historical features and was excluded from the National Register nomination. Consequently, the less-than-one-acre area in the National Register infobox covers only the fieldhouse, not the entire 9.01-acre park.

The fieldhouse has an indoor pool and a combined gymnasium and assembly hall with a stage, as well as a kitchen and clubrooms. Outdoor amenities include four baseball or softball fields, a combined football and soccer field, an artificial-turf soccer field, a tennis court, a fitness course, community gardens, a dog-friendly area, and an accessible playground with a spray feature. The park also hosts adaptive recreation and Special Olympics training.

== Community role ==
The park was planned as a year-round neighborhood center rather than only as an outdoor recreation ground. Early facilities included indoor and outdoor gymnasiums, athletic fields, tennis courts, playgrounds, pools, showers, a library branch, and classrooms. Its programs included gymnastics, social and folk dancing, plays, films, and public lectures; organizations such as the Polish Falcons and Polish Turners also used the building. During the first indoor season of 1916–1917, 875 people enrolled in its gymnasium programs. By the following year, the library branch recorded almost 50,000 visits.

The second-floor library remained in the fieldhouse for decades. The building also housed one of Chicago's first two Polish-language Saturday schools; the Tadeusz Kościuszko School of Polish Language later moved from its small rooms there. After World War II, English-language and citizenship classes at the park served displaced persons from Eastern Europe, including Polish refugees living nearby.

Community gatherings historically included bonfires, festivals, ice skating, amateur performances, and athletic events. In 1998, children in a park art class created a mural and mosaic in the fieldhouse reading "Welcome to the land of Koz"; its tropical imagery resonated with the neighborhood's Latino residents.

== See also ==
- Tadeusz Kościuszko Monument (Chicago)
