= Kosciusko Island =

Island in southeastern Alaska, United States

Coordinates: 56°02′31″N 133°32′19″W

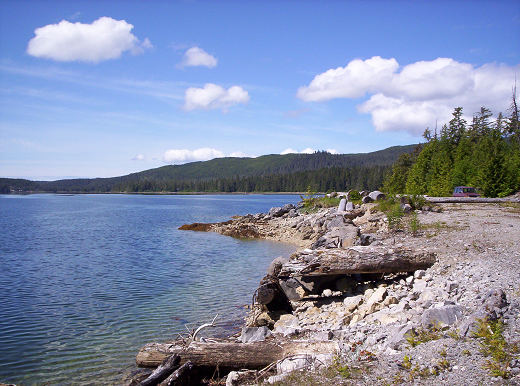
- Scenic view of Edna Bay Alaska - the only city on Kosciusko Island

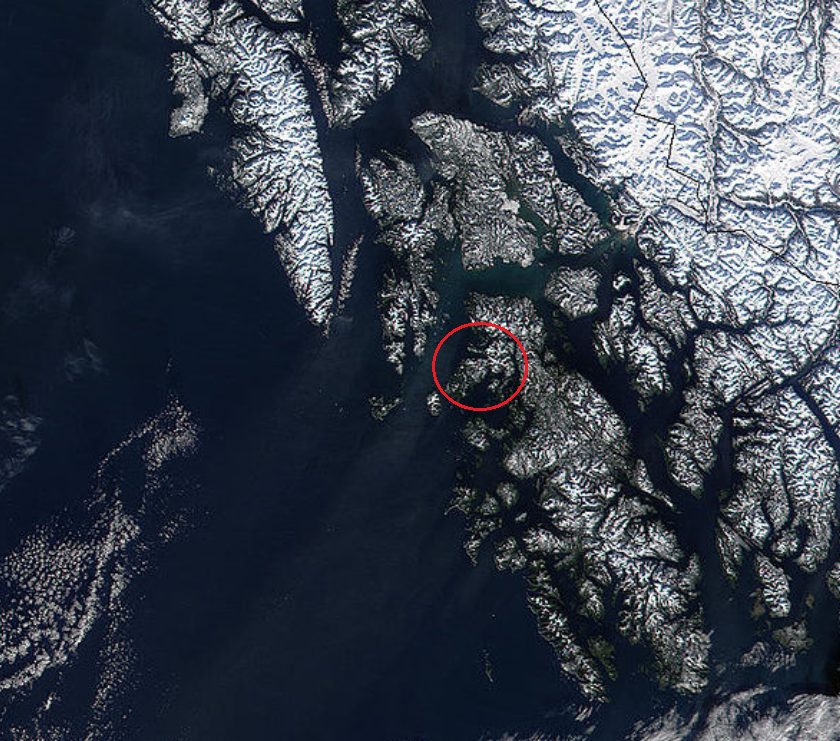
- Location of Kosciusko Island

- Location within Alaska

Geography
- Area: 171.585 sq mi (444.40 km^{2})

Administration
- United States
- State: Alaska
- Borough: Unorganized Borough
- Largest settlement: Edna Bay

Kosciusko Island is an island in the Alexander Archipelago of southeastern Alaska, United States. It lies near the northwest corner of Prince of Wales Island, just across the El Capitan Passage from the larger island.

The island is home to Mount Francis, Holbrook Mountain, and Tokeen Peak. Kosciusko Island has a land area of 171.585 square miles (444.40 km^{2}), making it the 38th largest island in the United States. It had a population of 52 persons as of the 2000 census, all in Edna Bay, its only populated town.

Kosciusko Island was named in 1879 by William H. Dall of the United States Coast and Geodetic Survey for Tadeusz Kościuszko.

The location of the long deserted village named Shakan is on the northwest coast of Kosciusko Island, not on nearby Shakan Island.

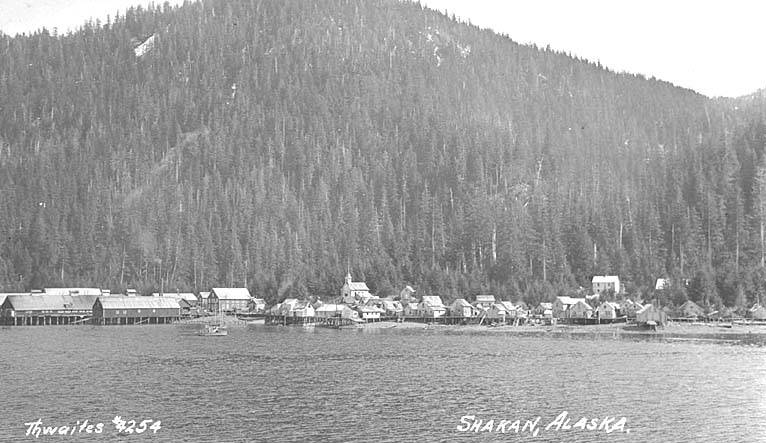
Village of Shakan, northwest coast of Kosciusko Island, ca. 1912

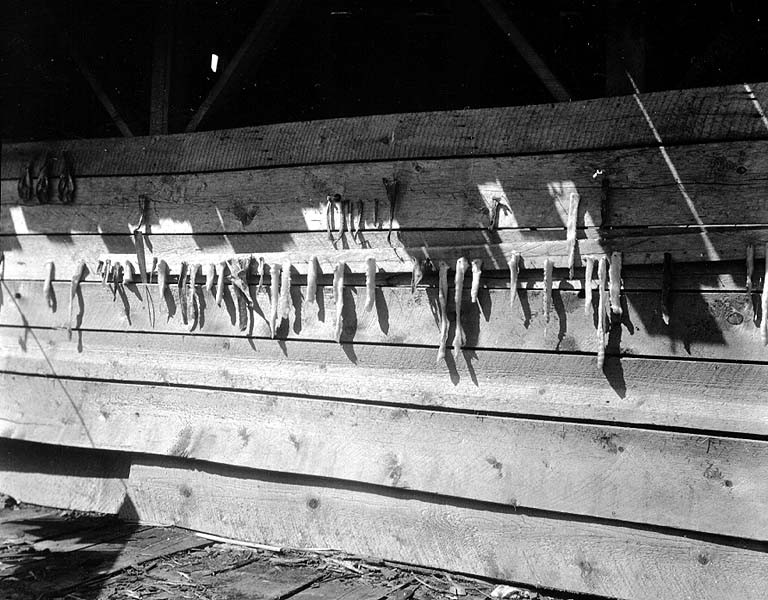
Fish drying on outside wall of house, Shakan, Alaska, July 16, 1911

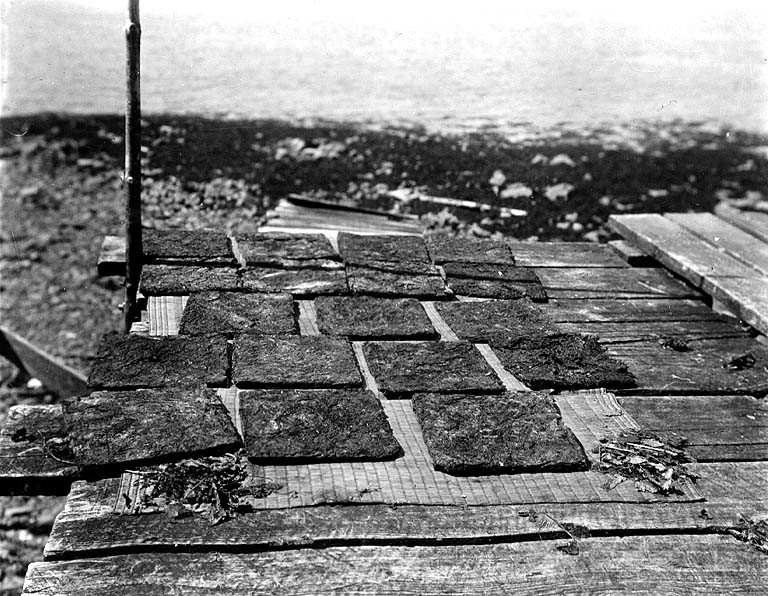
Cakes of seaweed being dried, July 1911

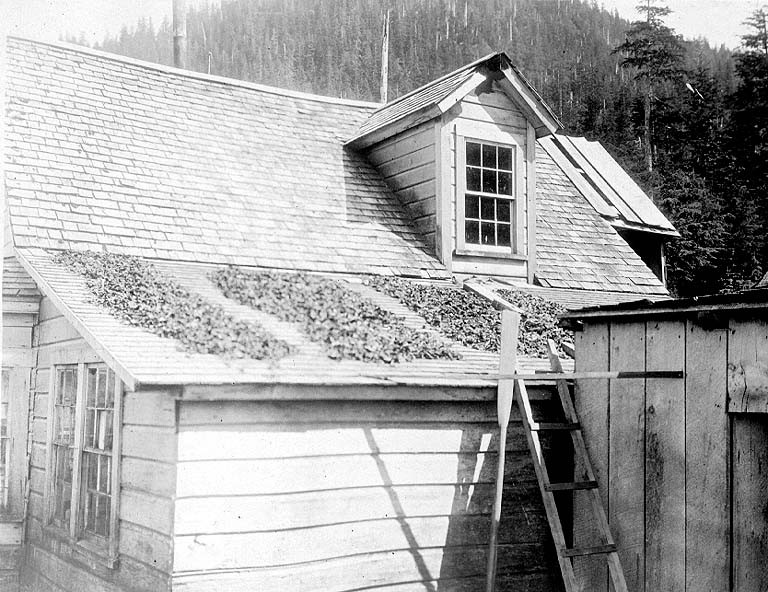
Seaweed drying on roof of a house in Shakan

== See also ==
- Shakan Island
- Edna Bay
