= Smith Row =

- U.S. National Historic Landmark District – Contributing property
- D.C. Inventory of Historic Sites
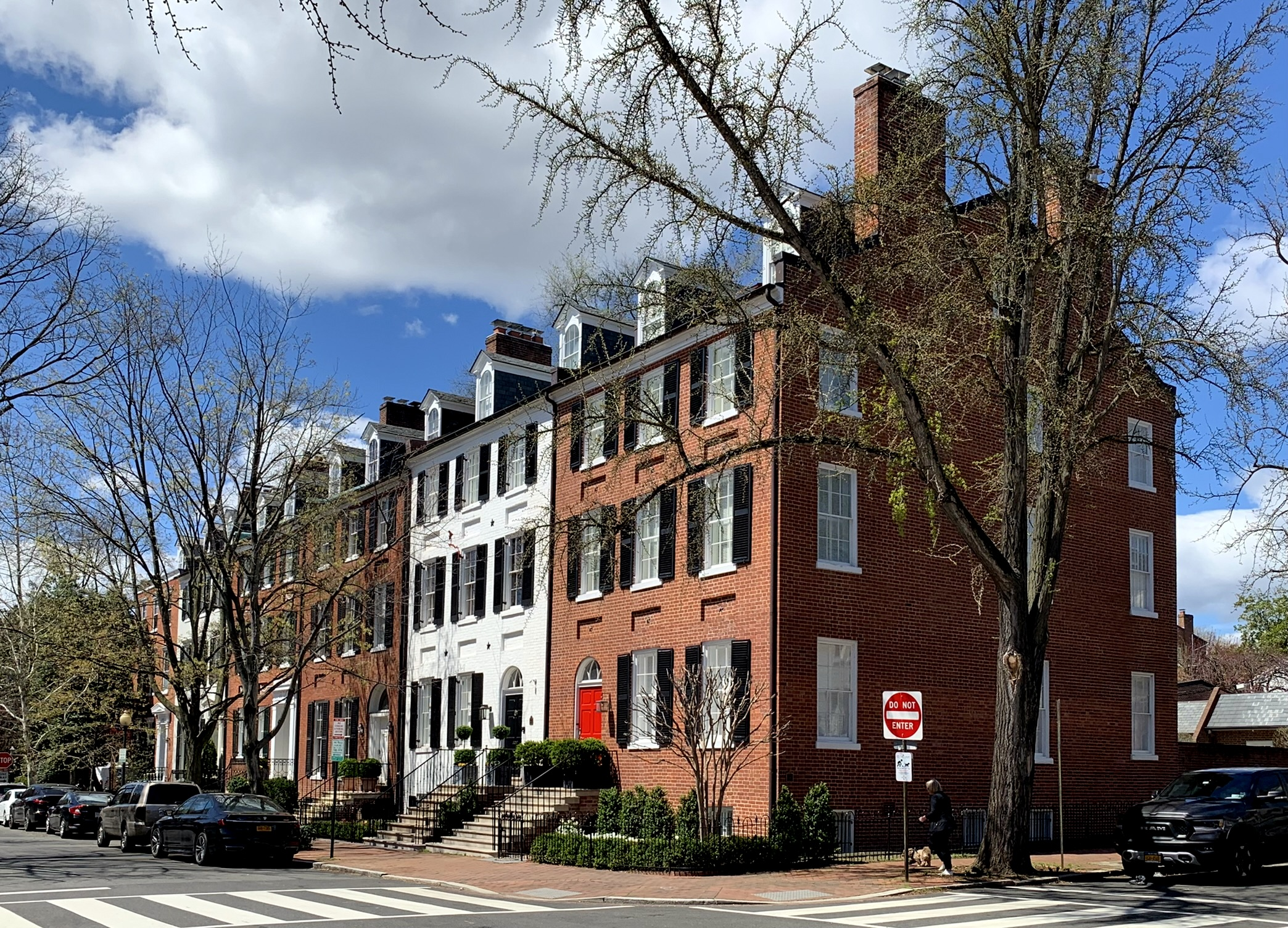
- Smith Row in 2022

- Location within District of Columbia Location within the United States
- Location: 3255–3267 N Street NW, Washington, D.C., U.S.
- Coordinates: 38°54′25″N 77°03′56″W
- Built: 1815
- Architectural style: Federal
- Part of: Georgetown Historic District (ID67000025)

Significant dates
- Designated NHLDCP: May 28, 1967
- Designated DCIHS: November 8, 1964

Smith Row is a group of six Federal-style townhouses within the Georgetown Historic District in Washington, D.C. Built in 1815 by brothers Clement and Walter Smith, the structures extend from 3255–3267 N Street NW.

It was added to the District of Columbia Inventory of Historic Sites in 1964.
