= UNMC =

UNMC may refer to:

- United Nations Millennium Campaign, a UNDP campaign unit working on issues related Millennium Development Goals
- Universalist National Memorial Church, the headquarters of the Universalist Church of America
- University of Nebraska Medical Center
- University of Nottingham Malaysia Campus
- United Nations Memorial Cemetery, in Busan, South Korea
