= Sixteenth Street Historic District =

- U.S. National Register of Historic Places
- U.S. Historic district
- D.C. Inventory of Historic Sites
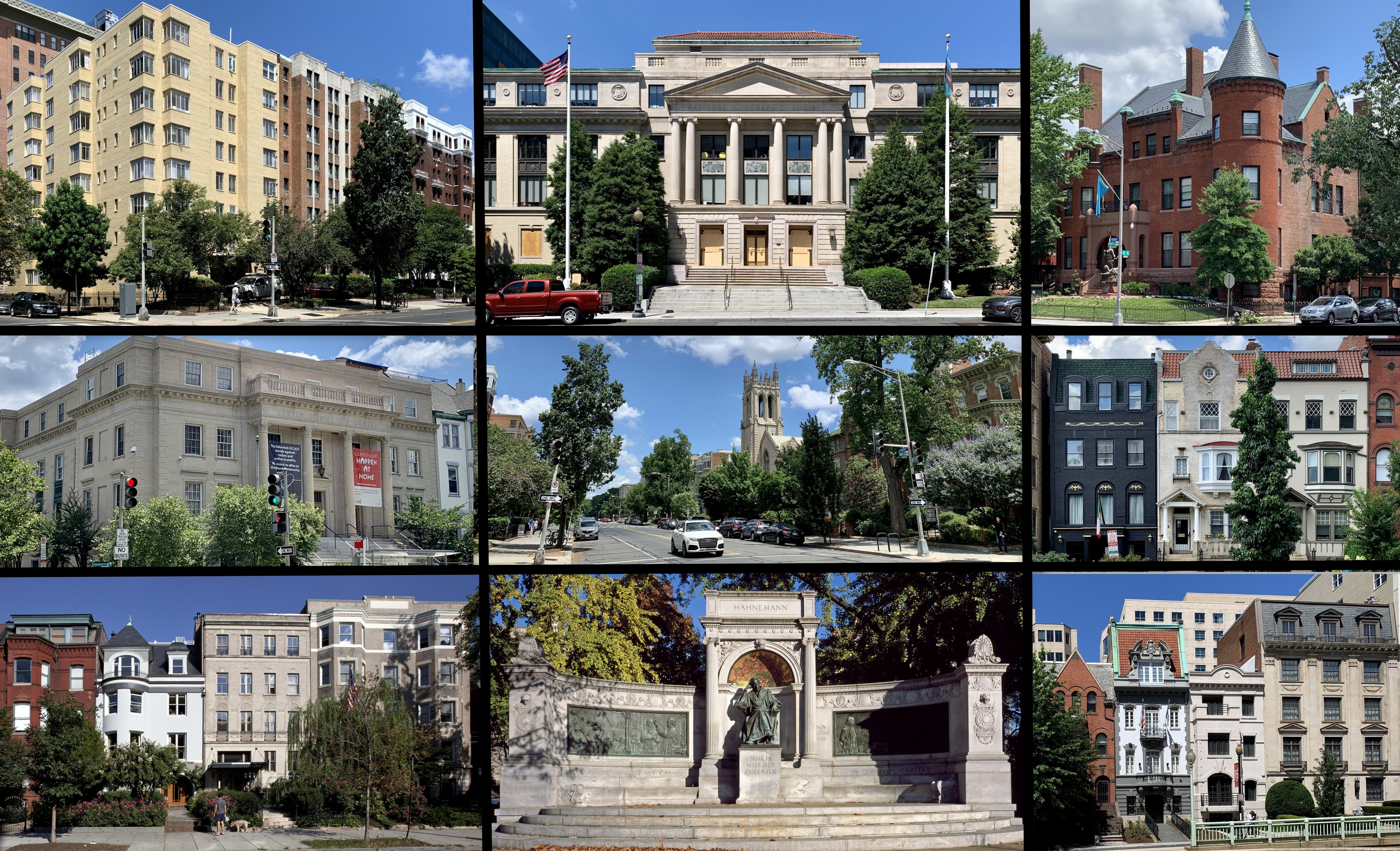
- From left to right on each row: 1600-1616 16th Street NW, National Geographic Society Headquarters, Embassy of Kazakhstan; Edlavitch Jewish Community Center, intersection of 16th and Q Streets NW, 2020-2024 16th Street NW; 1625-1631 16th Street NW, Samuel Hahnemann Monument, 1212-1222 16th Street NW

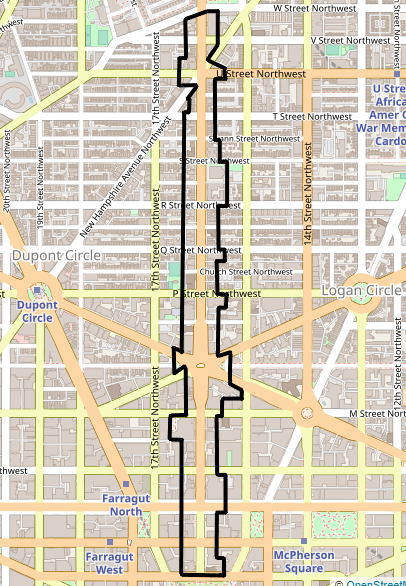
- Location: 16th Street NW between H Street and Florida Avenue, Washington, D.C., US
- Area: 1.25 miles (2.01 km)
- Built: 1816-1959
- Architect: Multiple
- Architectural style: Art Deco, Beaux-Arts, Gothic Revival, Italianate, Modern, Neoclassical, Queen Anne, Richardsonian Romanesque
- NRHP reference No.: 78003060 (original); 07000671 (increase)

Significant dates
- Added to NRHP: August 25, 1978
- Boundary increase: July 11, 2007
- Designated DCIHS: March 9, 1977

The Sixteenth Street Historic District is a 1.25-mile (2.01 km) linear historic district in Washington, D.C., that includes all structures along 16th Street NW between H Street and Florida Avenue. The district's southern boundary is bordered by Lafayette Square, just north of the White House, and Meridian Hill Park on its northern boundary. It includes an eclectic mix of architectural styles on one of the city's most historic and important numbered streets including single and multi-family residential buildings, embassies, hotels, churches, and office buildings.

Most of the district's oldest structures are religious and residential buildings, while many of the commercial buildings were built in the early to mid-20th century. The stretch of 16th Street between Scott Circle and Florida Avenue was recognized as a historic district in 1978 and listed on the National Register of Historic Places, and in 2007 it was expanded to include buildings south of Scott Circle to H Street. The historic district is also listed on the District of Columbia Inventory of Historic Sites.

The street was laid out in the 1791 plan by engineer and architect Pierre Charles L'Enfant. Most of 16th Street remained undeveloped until after the Civil War when the street and city itself began to experience large-scale growth and development during the Reconstruction era. By the late 19th century, 16th Street had become a fashionable area lined with elaborate homes and this popularity continued into the early 20th century.

Years later many of these homes were razed to make way for hotels, commercial buildings, and other projects before historic preservation gained popularity. Some of these replacement buildings have since been razed or remodeled, including the Third Church of Christ, Scientist, which was demolished in 2014 following years of legal battles, and the Embassy of Australia, demolished in 2020.

The district includes several individually listed buildings and monuments. Three of these are National Historic Landmarks: St. John's Episcopal Church, the Carnegie Institution of Washington Administration Building, and the Robert Simpson Woodward House. Significant contributing properties in the historic district include the Embassy of Kazakhstan, Hay–Adams Hotel, House of the Temple, and the Russian ambassador's residence. Noted architects whose work is represented in the district include Carrère and Hastings, Arthur B. Heaton, Benjamin Henry Latrobe, Mihran Mesrobian, John Russell Pope, and Jules Henri de Sibour.

== Geography ==
The Sixteenth Street Historic District measures approximately 1.25 miles (2.01 km) on 16th Street NW from the north side of H Street on its southern border to the south side of Florida Avenue on its northern border. It includes all properties facing 16th Street within those borders: Squares 174–186, 188–200, and Reservations 62–64, and 146–147. The linear north–south street is 160 feet (49 m) wide, wider than any other numbered street in the city and the same width as the city's major avenues, which includes the 50 feet (15 m) wide roadway with four lanes of two-way traffic.

The federal government owns the right-of-way between the building lines while the road, sidewalks, and planted areas such as tree boxes are under the jurisdiction of the District of Columbia Department of Public Works. There are wide sidewalks on each side of the street, except between M and O Streets where an underpass goes beneath Scott Circle. Major roads that intersect 16th Street in the historic district include H Street, K Street, M Street, Massachusetts Avenue, Rhode Island Avenue, P Street, U Street, Florida Avenue, and New Hampshire Avenue. The district begins in Downtown and passes through the Dupont Circle and U Street neighborhoods. The street continues north past the historic district for another 5.25 miles (8.45 km) to the city's boundary with Montgomery County, Maryland.

There are 161 buildings and structures in the historic district, 16 of which are considered non-contributing buildings that were constructed after 1959 or have been significantly altered. Most of the structures north of Scott Circle are residential, including rowhouses, apartment buildings, and houses converted into office space. Commercial structures including office buildings and hotels comprise most of the properties south of Scott Circle, but there are also a dozen houses still standing. There are three public artworks in and around Scott Circle: Daniel Webster Memorial (Reservation 62), Equestrian statue of Winfield Scott (Reservation 63), and Samuel Hahnemann Monument (Reservation 64).

The Sixteenth Street Historic District neighbors six other National Register of Historic Places (NRHP) historic districts: Lafayette Square (south), Dupont Circle (west), Fourteenth Street (east), U Street (east), Strivers' Section (west), and Meridian Hill (north). 16th Street is a contributing street and Reservations 62-64 contributing parks to the L'Enfant Plan of the City of Washington, which was listed on the NRHP in 1997.

== History ==
=== 1790s–1850s ===
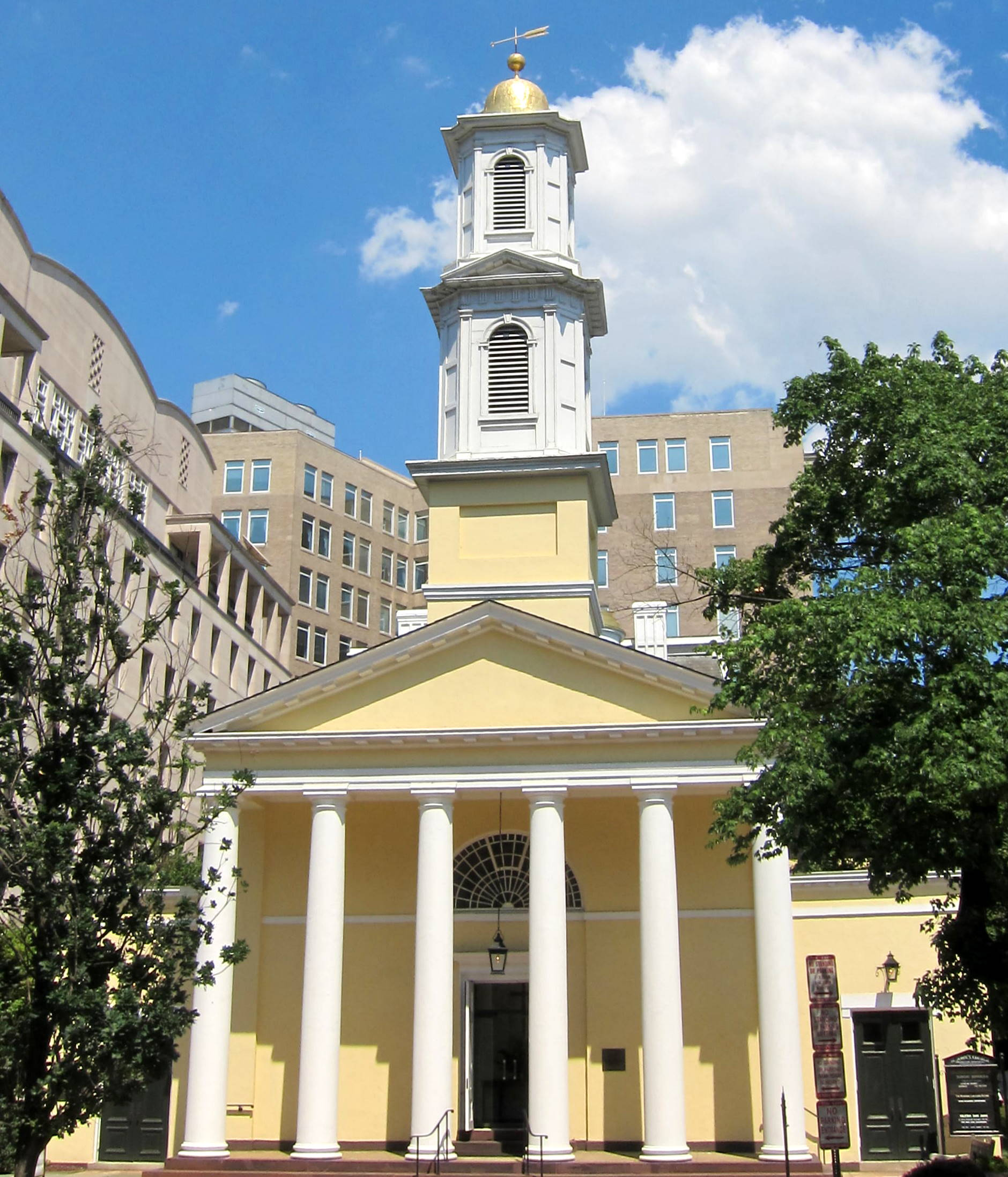
St. John's Episcopal Church, built in 1816, was one of the first major buildings constructed on 16th Street.

Before the City of Washington was founded, the area along present-day 16th Street NW was privately owned farmland. From the White House to L Street, the area was called Port Royal and owned by Samuel Davidson, from L Street to S Street the area was called Jamaica, owned by John Waring, and north of S Street was called Flint's Discovery, owned by Robert Peter. The right-of-way was transferred to the federal government after plans were made for a city layout.

In 1791, President George Washington appointed engineer Pierre Charles L'Enfant to design the new federal capital. The L'Enfant Plan included wide streets radiating from public squares and landmarks, including the new home of the president. His plan for 16th Street included a wide road that would lead from Boundary Street, now known as Florida Avenue, south to the president's home. Although some of his plans for 16th Street were changed, including additional public squares that were to be located along the street, L'Enfant's predecessor proceeded with having an open space at the intersection of Massachusetts and Rhode Island Avenues, present-day Scott Circle.

One of the first major buildings constructed on 16th Street was St. John's Episcopal Church, completed in 1816 and designed by Benjamin Henry Latrobe, located on the northeast corner of H Street across from present-day Lafayette Square. Development on 16th Street lagged for many years due to most residents choosing to live in the Capitol Hill and Southwest neighborhoods. One prominent resident that did live in the area was John Adams II, son of President John Quincy Adams, whose circa 1829 home was located on the northwest corner of 16th and I Streets.

In 1853 gas streetlamps were installed on the east side of the street, but most of the lots were undeveloped. That same year a report by engineer and Brigadier General Montgomery C. Meigs documented 100 dwellings, two stores, and St. John's Church in the vicinity of 16th Street between H and Boundary Streets. Many of these dwellings either faced adjoining streets or were shanties. In 1856 Benjamin Brown French, the Public Commissioner of Buildings, described 16th Street beyond K Street as a "zig-zag cart track" and suggested "if it was opened and graded to Boundary Street, besides being one of the largest and finest streets in the metropolis, it would greatly tend to relieve the barren prospect which meets the eye from the north front of the President's House between K and Boundary streets."

=== 1860s–1870s ===
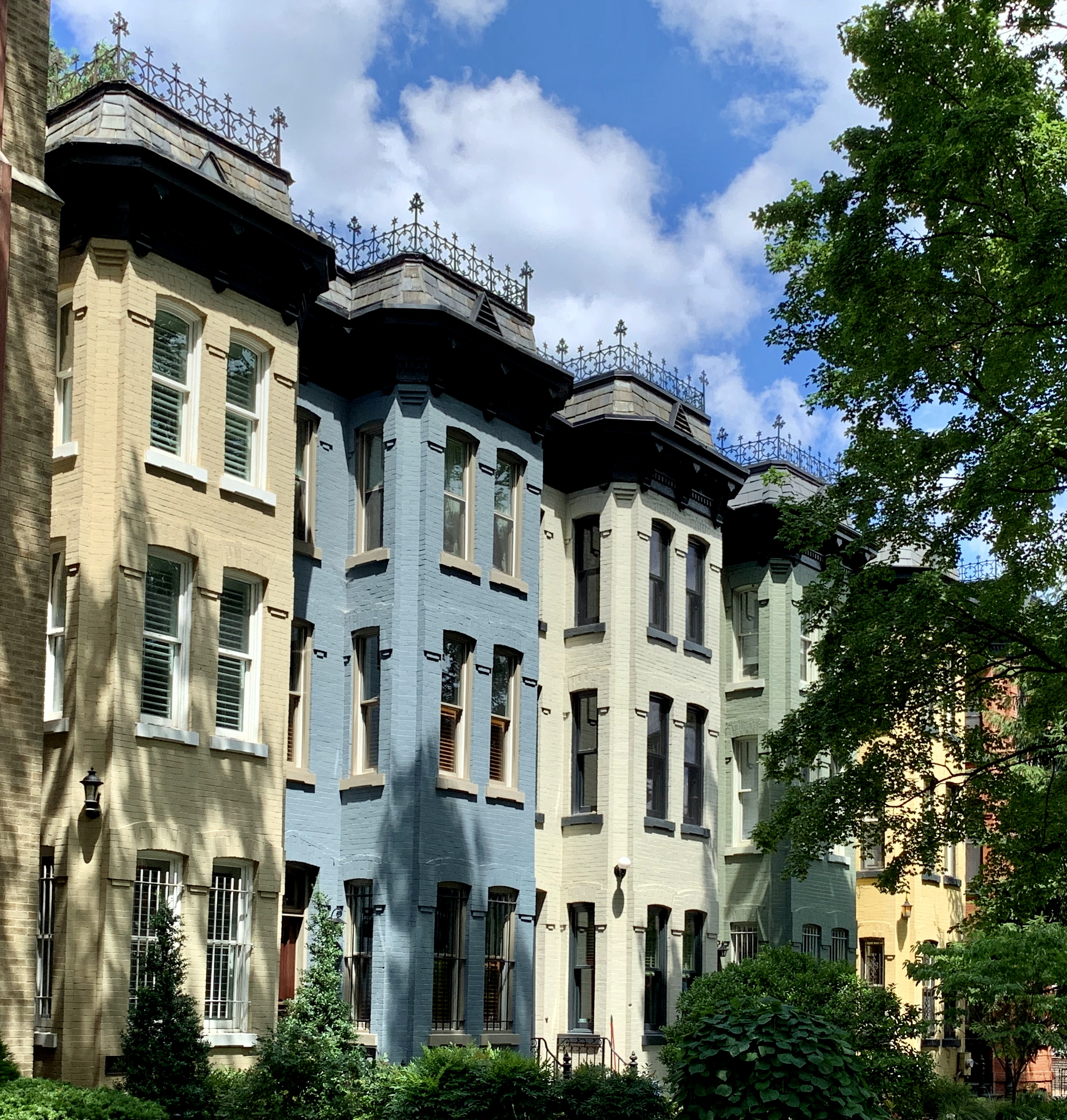
1816–1826 16th Street NW, built in 1876

At the time the Civil War broke out in 1861, there were only ten structures on 16th Street between present-day Scott Circle and Meridian Hill Park. During the war plans to improve the street were put on hold. On the northern end of the historic district, the farm at Boundary Street was used as a hospital and encampment for Union soldiers. The years after the war saw immense change and growth in the city. Alexander "Boss" Shepherd, who served as the city's Board of Public Works and later as governor, oversaw large-scale improvements to the city's streets, including 16th Street which was paved from Lafayette Square to Boundary Street. Tulip trees were planted along the street and due to changes which narrowed the city's right-of-way, the surviving trees are now in front yards. Several of these trees are older than the buildings on the property. There are also English oaks and maple trees lining the road.

Scott Circle was formed in 1873 when the rectangular plot of land at 16th Street, Massachusetts Avenue, and Rhode Island Avenue was redesigned as a circular park with a small triangular park on the east and west sides. The equestrian statue honoring General Winfield Scott that is sited in the middle of the circle was dedicated in 1874. These improvements still did not spur major development until the next decade. Storage facilities, lumber yards, shanties, and kilns lined 16th Street between K Street and Scott Circle during the 1870s. Due to mosquito-infested streams that flowed south from Meridian Hill, building a house between the area of Scott and Dupont Circle was considered unfashionable.

Smaller homes were built further north on 16th Street during the 1870s. Some of these early houses still standing are 1904 16th Street built in 1875, the Queen Anne row of homes at 1816–1826 16th Street built in 1876, the Italianate 1900 and 1902 16th Street built in 1878, and 1601–1607 16th Street built between 1878 and 1880. The garage for 1601 16th Street, built as a stable in 1878, is one of the oldest stables still standing in the city.

=== 1880s–1890s ===
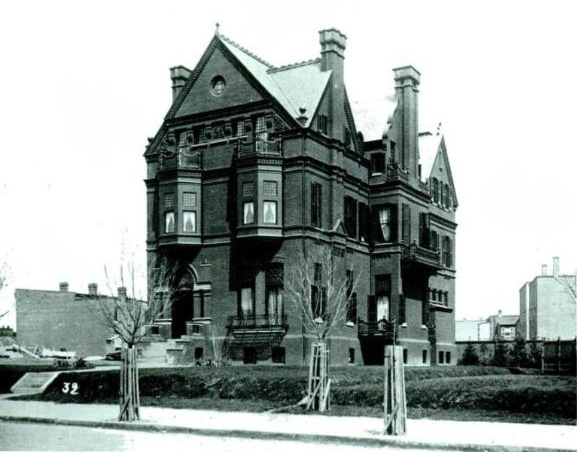
The Pendleton House, built in 1881, on the northeast corner of Scott Circle. It was demolished and replaced with The General Scott apartment building.

During the 1880s a number of expensive and ornate homes were finally built along lower 16th Street and around Scott Circle, an area that at the time was racially integrated and included simple frame houses. On the southeast corner of 16th and K Streets, Nicholas Longworth Anderson commissioned Henry Hobson Richardson to build a large house in 1881, the first of four homes that Richardson would design in the city. That same year new houses were built on Scott Circle for Secretary of the Treasury William Windom on the northwest corner, Senator George H. Pendleton's on the northeast corner, and Senator J. Donald Cameron which was on the east side of Pendleton's house facing Rhode Island Avenue. In 1883 Stilson Hutchins, founder of The Washington Post, also built a home on the northwest corner. He later donated funds for the erection of the Daniel Webster Memorial, sited on the west side of Scott Circle. In 1884 the adjoining homes of John Hay and Henry Adams that were designed by Richardson were built on the northwest corner of 16th and H Streets, across from St. John's.

There were also smaller homes built around Scott Circle, including a Victorian building on the southwest corner rented by Alexander Graham Bell in 1883 which housed his Bell Experimental School. A large home built south of Scott Circle in 1886 was for Lucius Tuckerman, whose Richardsonian Romanesque house on the southwest corner of 16th and I Streets was designed by Hornblower & Marshall. North of Scott Circle larger homes built during this period include the Richardsonian Romanesque 1623 16th Street, built in 1886 and designed by Albert W. Fuller, and 1401 16th Street, a similar style house built in 1888 which later served as the residence of Vice President James S. Sherman.

Modest rowhouses built by real estate developers were also constructed during this period. In addition to these houses, large religious buildings were erected on 16th Street beginning in the 1880s. In 1889, First Baptist Church moved into a new Romanesque Revival building on the southwest corner of 16th and O Streets. It was designed by William Bruce Gray and featured a 140-foot (43 m) tower. On the northern end of the historic district, development was slow and the area around 16th and U Streets featured farms, shacks, and swampy land.

During the 1890s, as the city continued to quickly grow, 16th Street became a fashionable place to live and many of the surviving homes north of Scott Circle were built during this period. One of the best examples of Queen Anne architecture in the historic district is the row of houses at 1837–1841 16th Street, built in 1890. Other homes built during this period include the Richardsonian Romanesque 1628 16th Street, designed by Harvey L. Page in 1890, and the Toutorsky Mansion at 1720 16th Street, a Flemish Revival house designed by William Henry Miller that was built in 1894 for Supreme Court Justice Henry Billings Brown. Senator Joseph B. Foraker built a large four-story house in 1897 on the northwest corner of 16th and P Streets that was designed by Paul J. Pelz. The Gothic Revival Church of the Holy City, also designed by Pelz, at 1611 16th Street was built in 1896 and features a 158-foot (48 m) tower and several Tiffany stained glass windows. South of Scott Circle a large house designed by Rotch & Tilden was built in 1891 for Senator Eugene Hale and located on the northeast corner of 16th and K Streets.

=== 1900s–1910s ===
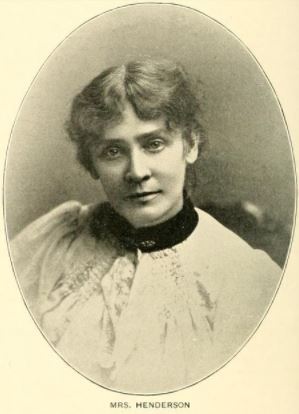
Mary Foote Henderson played a large role in the development and preservation of 16th Street.

Development on 16th Street increased after the turn of the 20th century, most notably after the McMillan Plan was issued. Architectural taste changed following the World's Columbian Exposition and that was represented in the transition to Beaux-Arts and neoclassical buildings constructed along the street. The early 20th century also saw the construction of apartments, institutional buildings, hotels, and churches along 16th Street, along with additional houses. There were almost as many empty lots facing 16th Street in 1903 as there were buildings, but during the next 20 years, a large number of buildings were constructed creating an almost united line of structures facing 16th Street.

Mary Foote Henderson played a large role in the development of the northern stretch of the historic district and has been described as the "dominant figure in the development of Sixteenth Street in the first quarter of the twentieth century." In 1889 she and her husband, Senator John B. Henderson, had built a massive house on 16th Street just north of Florida Avenue called Henderson Castle. The couple had purchased dozens of lots in the area and were vocal advocates of the City Beautiful movement, encouraging politicians and foreign governments to build monuments, houses, and embassies near present-day Meridian Hill Park. One of the first luxury apartment buildings built in this newly popular stretch of 16th Street was The Balfour at 2000 16th Street, designed in the Renaissance Revival style by George S. Cooper in 1900. Mary continued to monitor development in the area by serving as president of the Sixteenth Street Improvement Association.

The 1900s saw the first large scale residential building erected south of Scott Circle. The Beaux-Arts Warder Apartment House on the southeast corner of 16th and M Streets was built in 1905 and designed by Jules Henri de Sibour and Bruce Price. These early apartment buildings were designed to resemble large mansions. Private residences built that same decade include a Georgian Revival mansion for Senator Simon Guggenheim, located on the northeast corner of 16th and M Streets, that was built in 1906 and also designed by de Sibour and Price. A Parisian type Beaux-Arts house at 1227 16th Street, designed by William Penn Cresson and Nathan C. Wyeth, was built in 1907 for wealthy widow Carolina Caton Williams. An elaborate Beaux-Arts home at 1218 16th Street was built for Alonzo Bliss in 1907 and designed by Albert Goenner. Another prominent house in this area that was designed by de Sibour and Price, 1128 16th Street NW, was built in 1909. This decade also saw the construction of an institutional building, the National Geographic Society's (NGS) Hubbard Memorial Hall at 1156 16th Street, built in 1902 and designed by Hornblower & Marshall. The NGS would later select Arthur B. Heaton to design Renaissance Revival additions completed in 1913 and 1932.

North of Scott Circle in the 1900s there was another church constructed, the Gothic Revival Foundry United Methodist Church at 1500 16th Street, built in 1904 and designed by Appleton P. Clark Jr. An example of the Arts and Crafts architectural style is the Charles L. Marlatt House at 1521 16th Street, built in 1909. The Alturas at 1509 16th Street is a small Italianate apartment building constructed in 1909. It was followed by mid-size and large apartment buildings constructed along 16th Street north of Scott Circle.

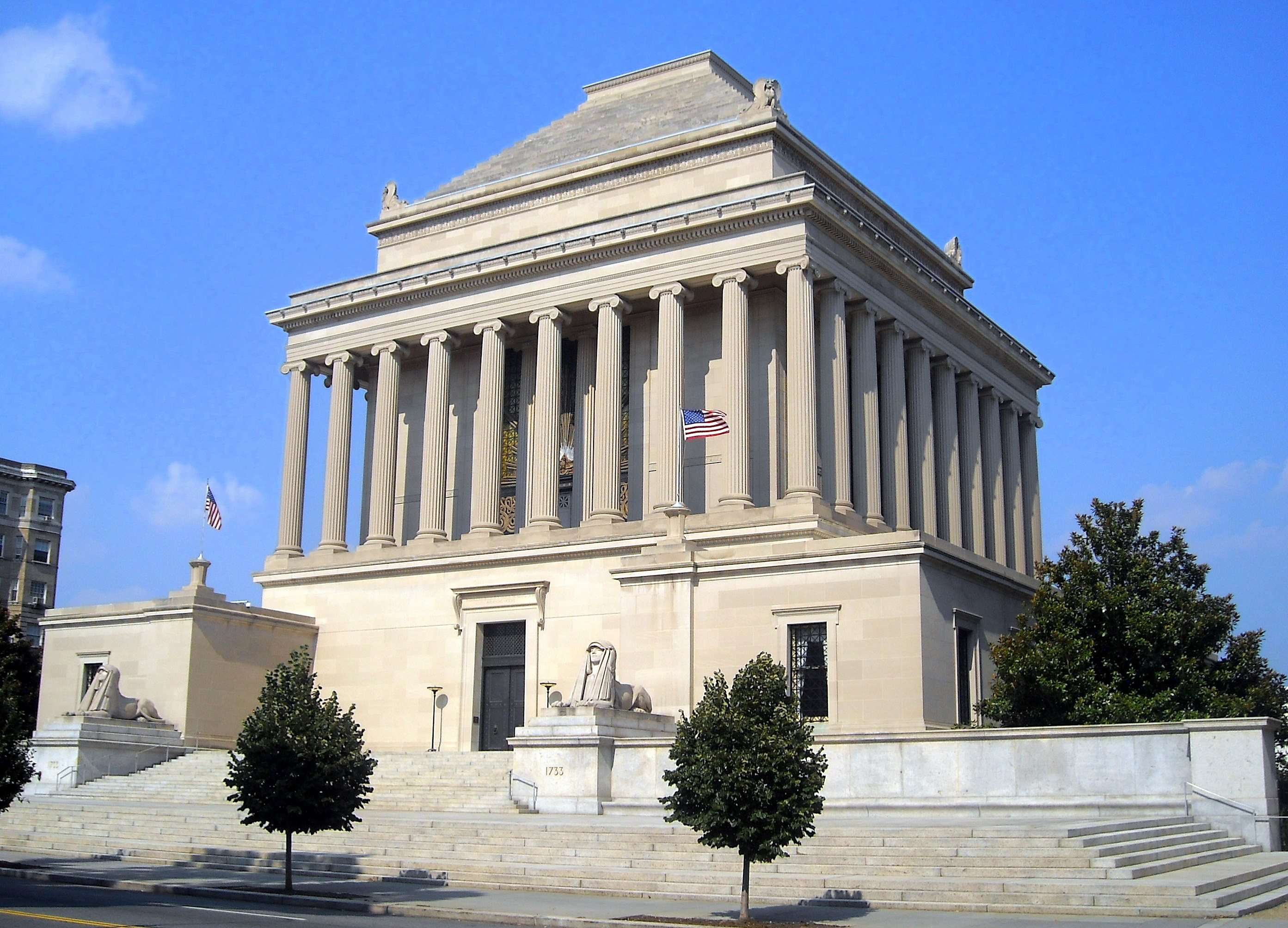
House of the Temple, built in 1916

During the 1910s several apartment buildings were constructed along the street. The Howard at 1842 16th Street, built in 1913 and designed by Frank Russell White, and the Somerset House at 1801 16th Street, built in 1916 and also designed by White, are two of four apartment buildings in the historic district by local real estate developer Harry Wardman. He would eventually build between 400 and 500 apartment houses throughout the city. This type of multi-family residential building would become extremely popular with local real estate developers during the next decade. Between 1919 and 1929, 741 apartment buildings were constructed in Washington, D.C., and 18 of these are still standing on 16th Street. One of the largest apartment buildings in the historic district, The Chastleton at 1701 16th Street, was built in 1919 and designed by Philip M. Jullien.

In an effort to have a prestigious address in the nation's capital, institutional organizations selected noted architects to design their impressive buildings on 16th Street. Carrère and Hastings designed the neoclassical Carnegie Institution of Washington Administration Building, completed in 1910, which sits on the southeast corner of 16th and P Streets. One of the most prominent buildings in the area, the imposing House of the Temple at 1733 16th Street, was built for the Scottish Rite of freemasonry in 1916. Architect John Russell Pope modeled it after the Mausoleum at Halicarnassus, one of the Seven Wonders of the Ancient World. Henderson played a large role in the neoclassical Congressional Club being built at the intersection of 16th, U Street, and New Hampshire Avenue. It was designed by one of Henderson's favorite architects, George Oakley Totten Jr., and completed in 1917.

The construction of large homes on 16th Street continued in the 1910s. Naval commander Richard T. Mulligan chose de Sibour to construct a five-story Colonial Revival mansion on the northwest corner of 16th and R Streets that was completed in 1910. That same year George Pullman's widow moved into her new Beaux-Arts mansion at 1125 16th Street, designed by Nathan C. Wyeth. Further north at 2100 16th Street Supreme Court Justice Charles Evans Hughes selected Totten Jr. to design his new home, completed in 1911.

=== 1920s–1930s ===
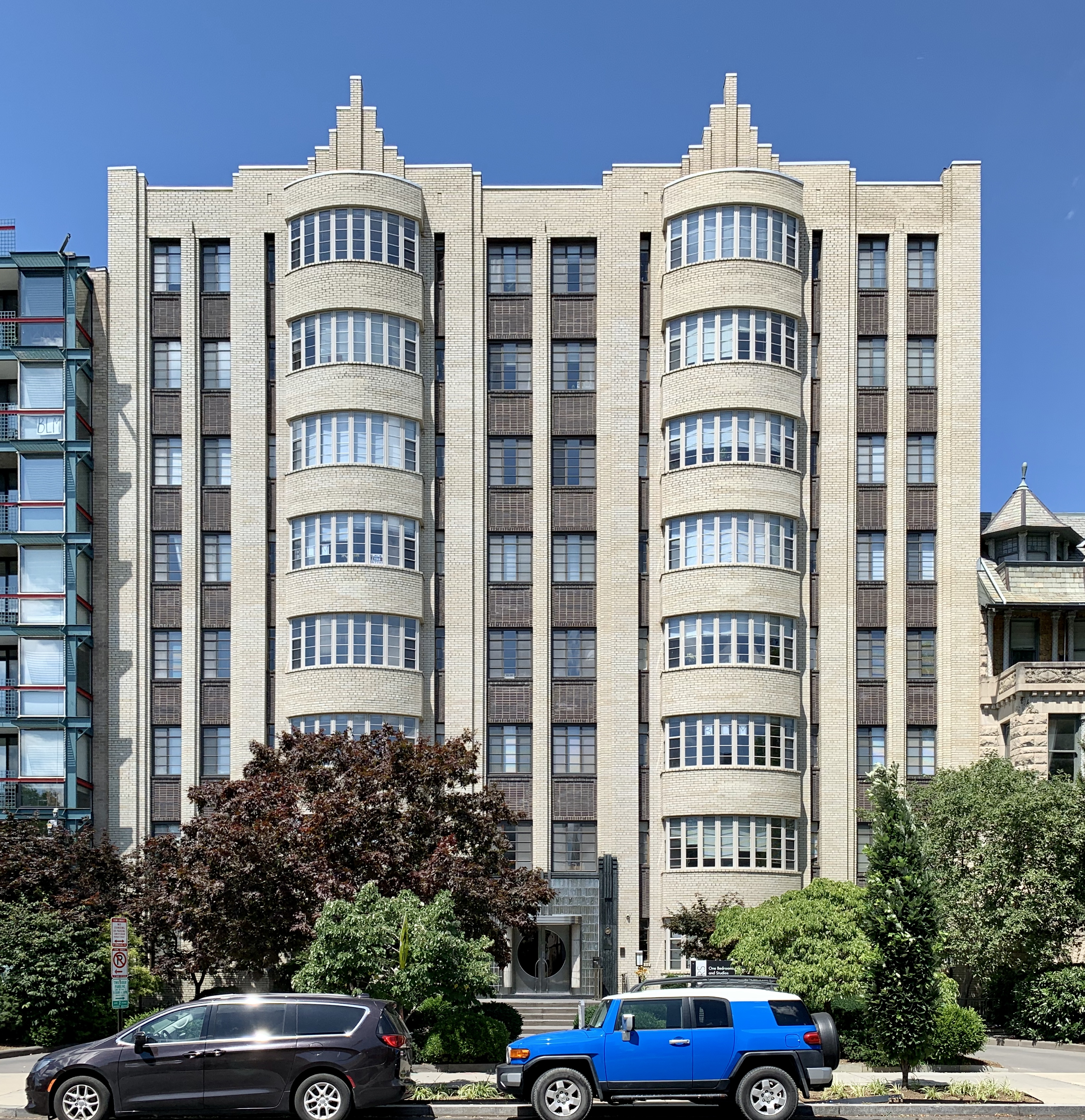
Hightowers Apartments, built in 1938

The construction of large homes on 16th Street came to an abrupt halt in the 1920s due to reevaluated property taxes being 150% higher than other areas of the city in addition to the federal income tax legislation that became law a few years prior. Construction of luxury apartment buildings continued though, including The Hadleigh at 2101 16th Street, designed in the Renaissance Revival style by Clark Jr. and completed in 1920. On lower 16th Street, the popularity of Beaux-Arts architecture continued in the design of apartment buildings. Examples include Joseph J. Moebs' 1222 16th Street, built in 1920, de Sibour's The Jefferson at 1200 16th Street, built in 1922, and Clark Jr.'s The Presidential at 1026 16th Street, also built in 1922.

It was during this same period when destruction of large homes built decades prior and the end of lower 16th Street being a single-family neighborhood first began. This coincided with the introduction of hotels along the street, two built by Wardman, who had also built the imposing neoclassical Racquet Club at 1135 16th Street NW, designed by de Sibour and completed in 1920. In 1925 the Anderson residence on the southeast corner of 16th and K Streets was the first of the area's large homes to be demolished. It was replaced with the Carlton Hotel, a Beaux-Arts luxury hotel designed by Mihran Mesrobian and built in 1926. The following year Wardman also demolished the adjoining Hay-Adams homes on the northwest corner of 16th and H Street and built an annex property to the Carlton. He chose Mesrobian to design the Renaissance Revival building and with permission from John Hay's daughter, Wardman named the new hotel The Hay-Adams.

The transition to the Art Deco architectural style began in the 1930s. The Hightowers Apartments at 1530 16th Street is an excellent example of streamlined Art Deco. It was built in 1938 and designed by Alvin L. Aubinoe and Harry L. Edwards. These new architectural trends are not reflected in the Universalist National Memorial Church at 1810 16th Street. The Romanesque Revival building, which features a 102-foot (31 m) tower, was designed by Allen & Collens and constructed in 1930.

=== 1940s–1950s ===
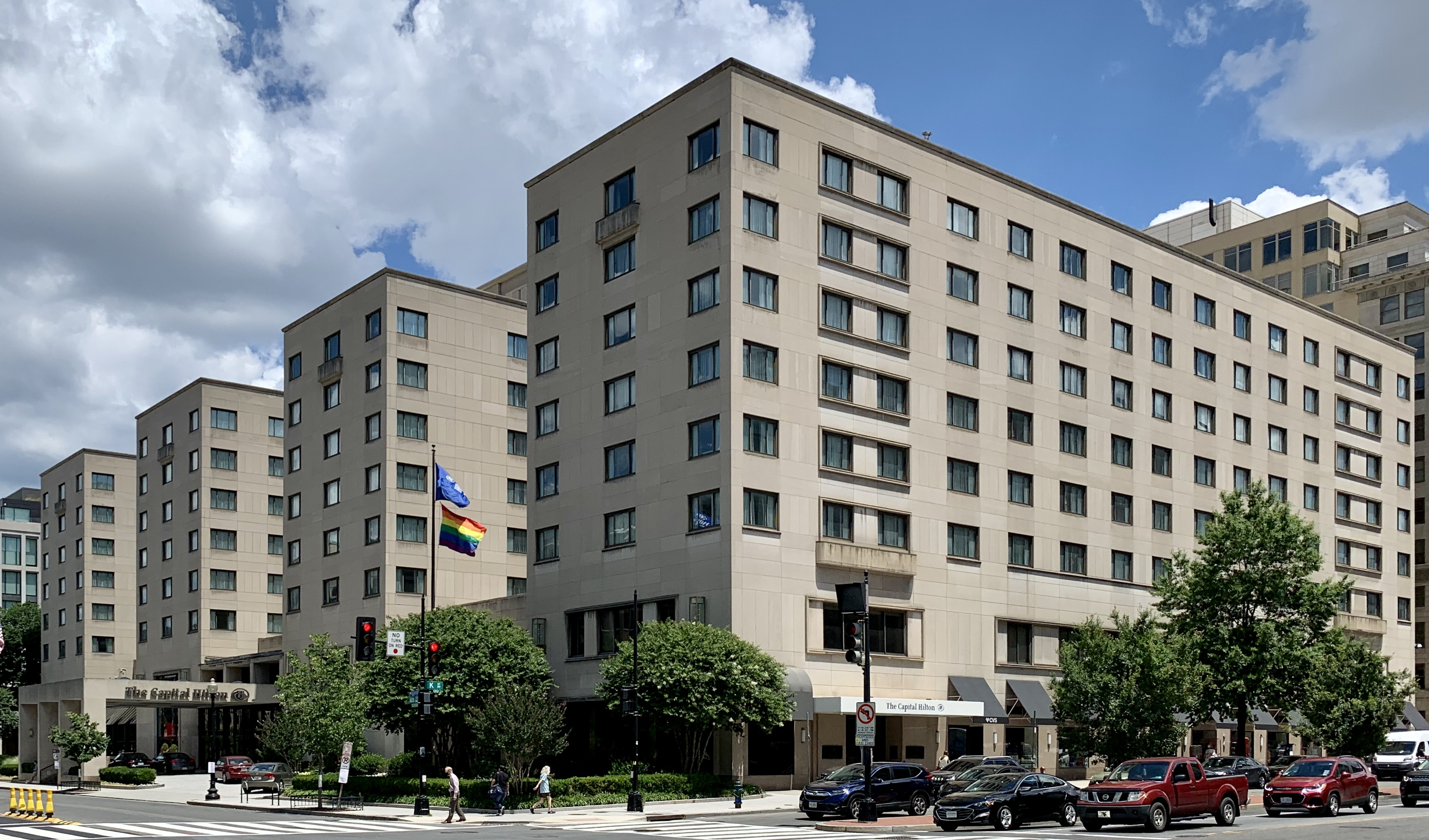
Hotel Statler, built in 1943

As commercial development continued on 16th Street and car ownership increased, traffic congestion became an issue. Scott Circle was considered especially dangerous and a city guidebook from the time stated: "with its inner and outer rings of surging traffic, this is for pedestrians probably the most hazardous ground within the District." In 1941 a tunnel was built beneath Scott Circle, allowing passengers traveling on 16th Street to avoid the intersections of Massachusetts and Rhode Island Avenues. A downside of this new layout was the Scott statue and surrounding grassy area in the middle of Scott Circle became inaccessible to pedestrians.

The construction of apartment buildings continued in the 1940s, especially around Scott Circle and lower 16th Street. The Pall Mall at 1112 16th Street NW was constructed in 1940 and architect Robert O. Scholz designed the building to reflect a combination of the Art Deco and Renaissance Revival styles. The following year The General Scott, an Art Deco apartment building also designed by Scholz, replaced the Pendleton residence and two adjoining houses that stood on the northeast corner of Scott Circle.

In addition to Art Deco, modernist architecture was also being built in the 1940s. The Hotel Statler at 1001 16th Street was designed by Holabird & Root in a restrained modernist style. The Hale House on the northeast corner of 16th and K Streets was demolished to make way for the 850-room hotel, the largest air-conditioned hotel in the world at the time of its opening in 1943. Another example of the restrained modernist style is the World Center Building, a commercial property on the southwest corner of 16th and K Streets that was built in 1949.

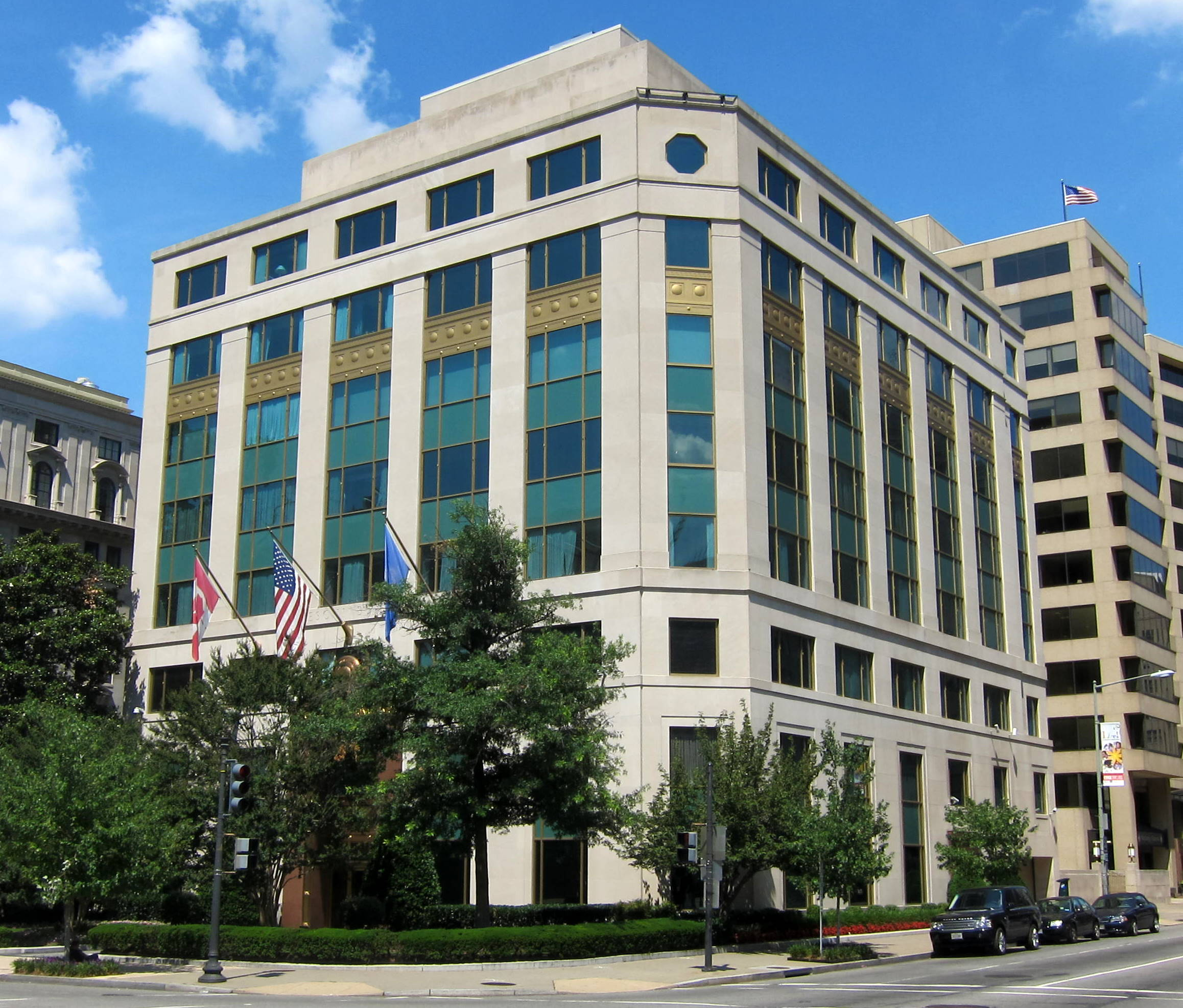
Moreschi Building, built in 1959

Modernist architecture was prevalent on 16th Street during the 1950s. The large apartment building at 1500 Massachusetts Avenue, constructed in 1950 and designed by F. Wallace Dixon, is an example of this. The narrow, trapezoid-shaped building faces Massachusetts Avenue and Scott Circle. A much smaller but visually interesting modernist apartment building at 1926 16th Street was constructed in 1952.

Demolition of 19th century buildings continued in the 1950s, especially south of Scott Circle, and most were replaced with office buildings on corner lots. The First Baptist Church congregation demolished their imposing building in 1953 and replaced it with a Gothic Revival sanctuary designed by Walter Horstmann Thomas and Harold E. Wagoner. The office buildings constructed south of Scott Circle during this decade were designed in a restrained modernist style. The National Rifle Association (NRA) built their headquarters at 1600 Rhode Island Avenue in 1954, the American Federation of Labor (now AFL–CIO) built their new headquarters in 1955 at 815 16th Street, next to St. John's Church, the National Education Association (NEA) demolished the Guggenheim House and the Hotel Martinique in 1956 for their expanded headquarters at 1201 16th Street, the Warder Apartment House was demolished in 1958 and replaced with a new headquarters for the American Chemical Society at 1155 16th Street, and in 1959 the International Hod Carriers (now the Laborers' International Union of North America) moved into their new headquarters, the Moreschi Building, at 905 16th Street. Both the Moreschi Building and AFL–CIO Building have full wall murals in their lobbies representing the history of the labor movement.

Continued development and the demolition of buildings on 16th Street were made easier after city officials adopted a revised zoning plan in 1958. Specific areas of the city that were considered neither residential nor commercial, including parts of 16th Street, were designated Special Purpose (SP). The area from Scott Circle north to Q Street was designated SP-1 and the area south of Scott Circle designated SP-2. This meant developers no longer needed approval from the city's Board of Zoning Adjustment when constructing office buildings and converting residential buildings into office space. This change also had an adverse effect on the architectural cohesiveness of 16th Street.

=== 1960s–1990s ===
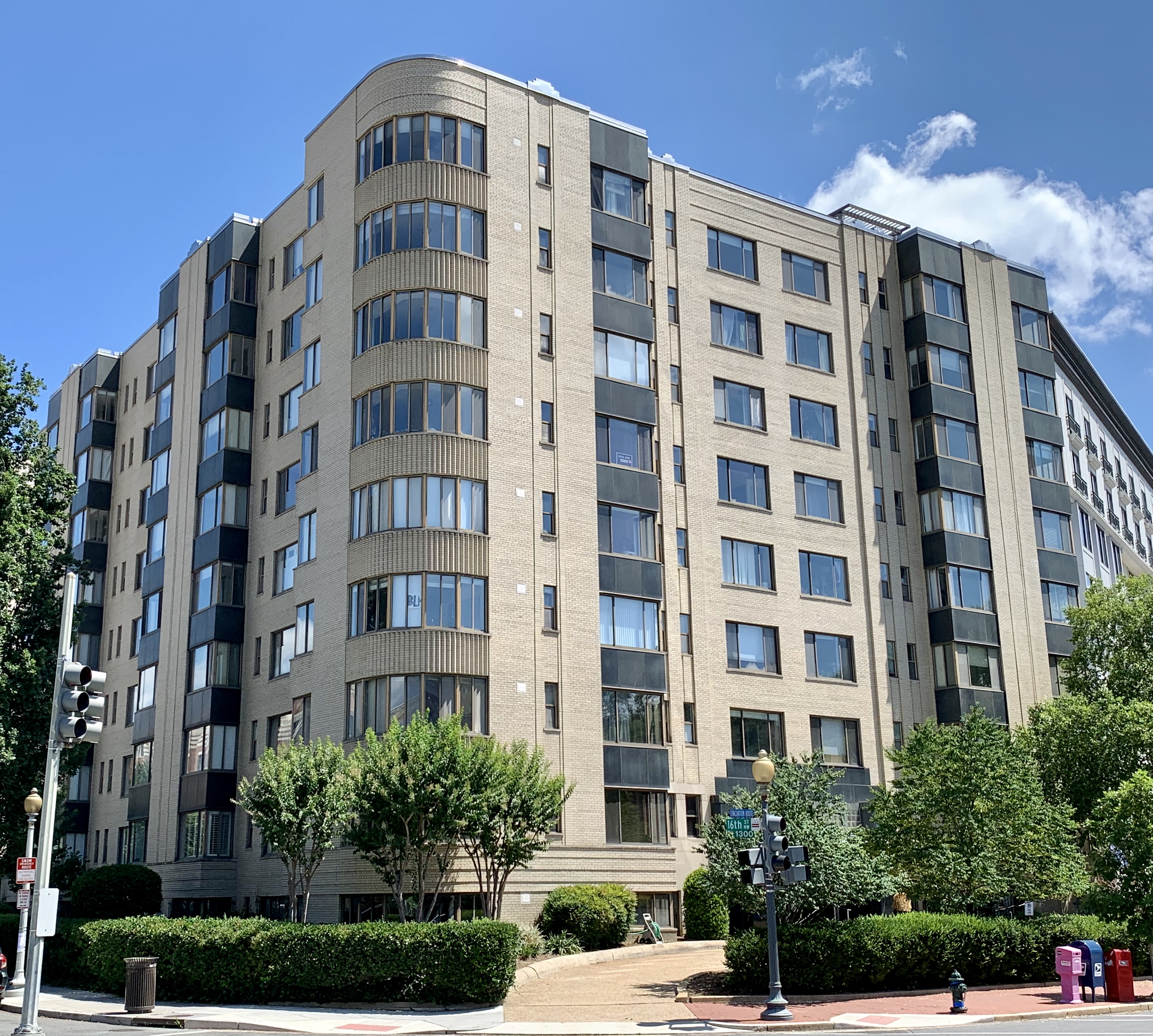
The General Scott, built in 1941, was originally designated a non-contributing property to the historic district.

The construction of commercial buildings and demolition of houses continued the following decade. In 1960, Foundry United Methodist Church demolished the Foraker House, which the church has purchased in 1923, and built a Gothic Revival annex on the northwest corner of 16th and P Streets. The Williams House was demolished in 1965 for another expansion of the NEA's headquarters, and in 1967 the Tuckerman House was demolished and replaced with the Motion Picture Association of America's headquarters. The Embassy of Australia, built in 1969, replaced the Windom Mansion on Scott Circle and adjoining properties on 16th Street.

In 1971 the Third Church of Christ, Scientist, and its adjoining office building for The Christian Science Monitor at 900 and 910 16th Street respectively were completed. The brutalist design was controversial at the time, especially for buildings erected on a prominent corner, 16th and I Streets, but the church interior was often praised. Araldo Cossutta of I. M. Pei & Partners designed the octagonal concrete building, which would eventually become a financial burden for the congregation. The former home of Supreme Court Justice Horace Gray, which replaced John Adams II's circa 1829 house, was demolished to make way for the church building. The demolition of the circa 1884 house in 1967, just a few months before the Tuckerman House was demolished, helped spur additional interest in the historic preservation of 16th Street. Much like the Christian Scientist buildings, the other office buildings constructed in the 1970s, the National Soft Drink Association's headquarters at 1100 16th Street built in 1970, and the circa 1974 American Association of University Women headquarters at 1111 16th Street, did not blend in architecturally with their surrounding modernist and Beaux-Arts neighbors.

Coinciding with a growing national interest in historic preservation, local activists and historians advocated for the protection and rehabilitation of remaining buildings on 16th Street. The Sixteenth Street Historic District was added to the District of Columbia Inventory of Historic Sites (DCIHS) on March 9, 1977, and listed on the National Register of Historic Places (NRHP) on August 25, 1978, and included 123 properties. By the time the Sixteenth Historic District was listed, almost 50 houses that once lined the street had been demolished. The 1978 historic district boundary included buildings on the north side of Scott Circle to the south side of Florida Avenue. At the time there were seven buildings identified as non-contributing properties, otherwise known as intrusions: The General Scott, the Australian embassy, the Melbourne House Apartments at 1315 16th Street, the office building at 1400 16th Street, the Churchill Apartments at 1520 16th Street, the Sixteen Hundred Apartments at 1600 16th Street, and the Washington House at 2120 16th Street.

Given how relatively few lots were still available on 16th Street, there was minimal development of new buildings in the last two decades of the 20th century. There was a small apartment building constructed, the Winston Mews at 1730 16th Street, and the remodeling of existing office buildings. One of these buildings, the American Chemical Society headquarters, was altered significantly enough in the 1980s that it no longer resembled other modernist buildings on lower 16th Street. The NRA sold its headquarters on Scott Circle and it was converted into a Courtyard by Marriott in 1997.

=== 21st century ===
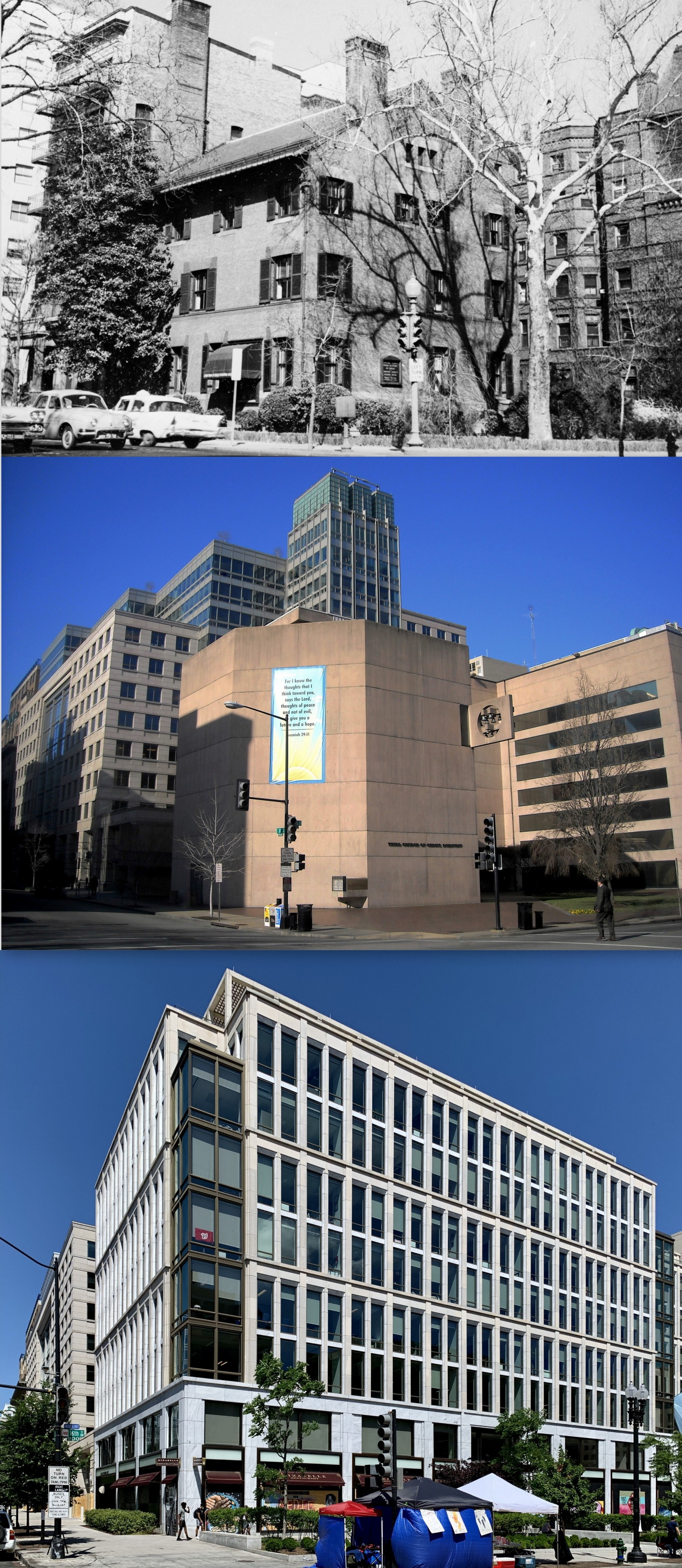
Three of four buildings that have stood on the northwest corner of 16th and I Streets NW. The former home of Supreme Court Justice Horace Gray, the Third Church of Christ, Scientist, and the current office building, 900 16th Street NW.

In the 2000s there were a few buildings constructed north of Scott Circle and additional remodeling of buildings on 16th Street below Scott Circle. The Regent apartment building at 1640 16th Street was constructed in 2001. The Tapies, a postmodern 21.1 ft (6.43 m) wide 8-story condominium at 1612 16th Street, was built in 2002 and designed by Bonstra Haresign Architects. It replaced a small frame 19th-century house that was sited between two large apartment buildings. The Solar Building at 1000–1010 16th Street was remodeled in 2002 and the Courtyard by Marriott renovated in 2004.

The Sixteenth Street Historic District was expanded in 2007 to include buildings on the south side of Scott Circle, buildings on 16th Street south of Scott Circle, and expansions of Squares 175 and 181 including the Rochelle Apartments at 1603 U Street. The newly expanded historic district included 161 structures, 16 of which were deemed intrusions. Three of the buildings that were previously considered intrusions, The General Scott, the Sixteen Hundred Apartments, and the Washington House, were redesignated as contributing properties. Buildings on lower 16th Street that were considered intrusions due to their significant remodeling or construction after 1959 include: the Courtyard by Marriott at 1600 Rhode Island Avenue, the National Geographic Society's Annexes at 1131–1137 17th Street and 1600 M Street, the National Education Association Annex at 1201 16th Street, the American Chemical Society headquarters at 1155 16th Street, office buildings at 1101 and 1111 16th Street, the office building at 1010 16th Street, the Solar Building at 1000–1010 16th Street NW, the Third Church of Christ, Scientist, and adjoining office building at 900–910 16th Street, and the Motion Picture Association of America headquarters at 1600 I Street.

For many years the Third Church of Christ, Scientist congregation had dealt with high maintenance costs, structural defects, and a decrease in the number of attendees in their 1971 building. In 1990 the congregation had inquired about selling the property, which meant the building would likely have been demolished since the layout would have been difficult for another organization to use. This resulted in third parties attempting to have the building designated a historic landmark. The nomination failed, but after a renewed attempt in 2007 the church and adjoining Christian Science Monitor Building were added to the DCIHS. The congregation attempted to have the church demolished the following year, but permits were denied by the city, setting off several years of legal battles, debates between locals and historians about its architectural significance, and debates about the separation of church and state. The congregation was eventually successful and the two buildings were demolished in 2014. The site was replaced with an office building completed in 2017, and the congregation meets in a portion of the building that features a mirrored glass entrance.

Another building that replaced a 19th-century home on 16th Street, the Australian embassy on Scott Circle, was demolished in 2020. Because the building was a non-contributing property to the historic district, approval for its demolition and the exterior design of the new chancery was not stringent. The new chancery was designed by Bates Smart and is expected to be completed in 2023. The building will feature a glass atrium, exhibition gallery, and environmentally responsible technology.

A two-block stretch of 16th Street in the historic district was renamed Black Lives Matter Plaza in 2020, following protests after the murder of George Floyd. The portion of 16th Street that was renamed is from H Street to K Street. A 35-foot (11 m) mural in yellow capital letters was painted onto the road reading Black Lives Matter along with the flag of Washington, D.C. The mural was removed in 2025 after Republican Representative Andrew Clyde threatened to withhold federal funds from the city if the mural was not painted over and the stretch of road be renamed Liberty Plaza.

== Significant contributing properties ==
On the significance of 16th Street, architectural historian Laura V. Trieschmann described:

As the primary route leading to the city's symbolic center, 16th Street has, since its layout, offered a distinguished address. The street has been sought after by prominent individuals for residences, by congregations for churches, by foreign dignitaries for embassies, and by heads of national organizations and trade associations intent upon establishing a notable presence in the nation's capital for their headquarters offices. This allure of location has ensured the prestigious viability of 16th Street throughout its history and has encouraged the varied and high quality collection of building types. Indeed, it is this mixture and academic eclecticism of 19th century row houses, freestanding mansions, apartment buildings, churches and 20th-century institutional buildings that provides continuity to the several-mile long linear stretch of the street from the White House to Florida Avenue.

Among the 145 contributing properties to the Sixteenth Historic District are several that are individually listed on the National Register of Historic Places (NRHP) and District of Columbia Inventory of Historic Sites (DCIHS). Three of these are further designated as National Historic Landmarks (NHL): St. John's Episcopal Church, the Carnegie Institution of Washington Administration Building, and the Robert Simpson Woodward House. While 16th Street below Scott Circle is mostly composed of commercial properties and apartment buildings, there are twelve single-family houses still standing, built between 1883 and 1920. North of Scott Circle there are 43 single-family houses. Seven religious buildings representing a variety of denominations are also in the historic district.

=== National Register of Historic Places ===
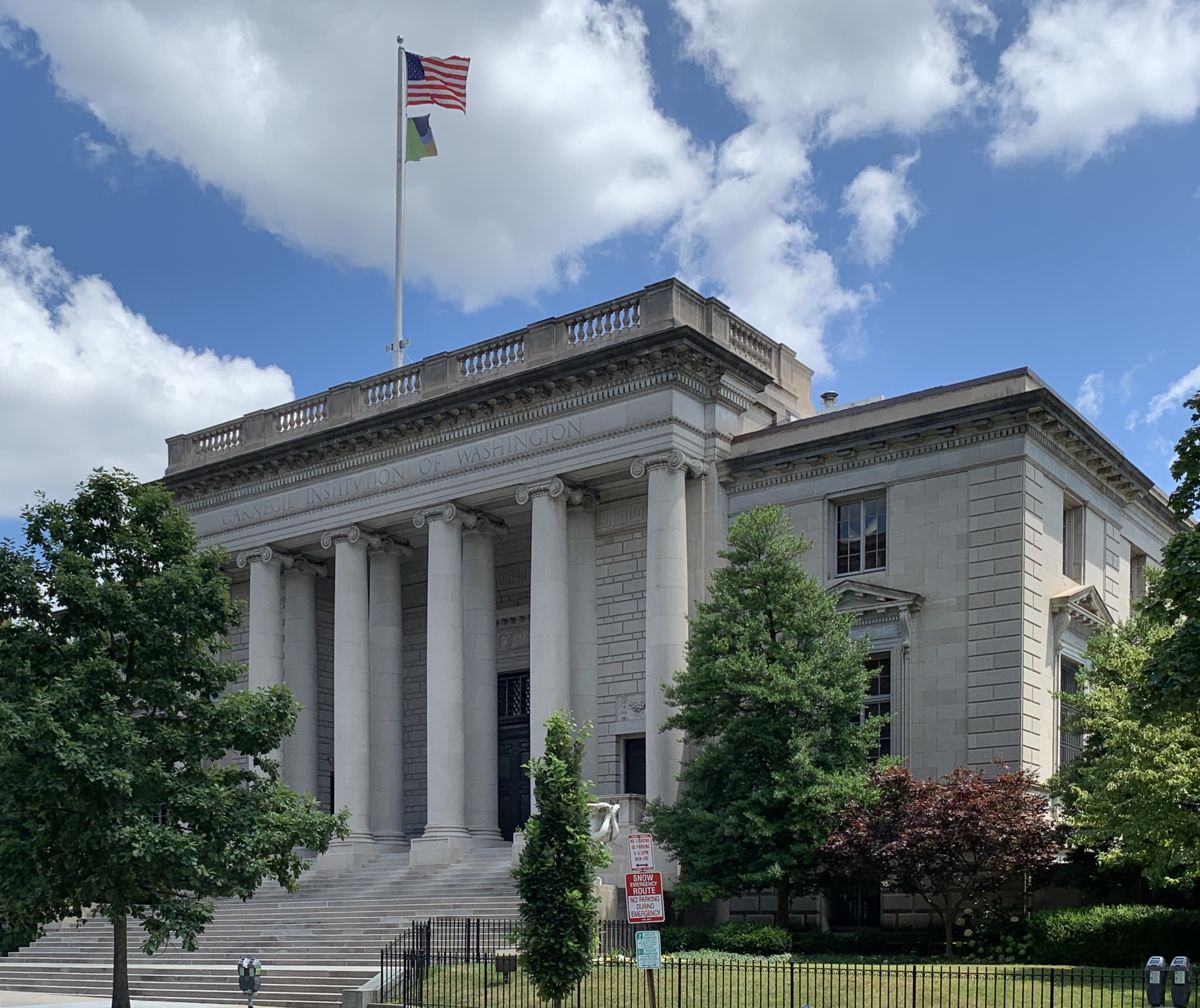
Carnegie Institution Administration Building, 1530 P Street NW

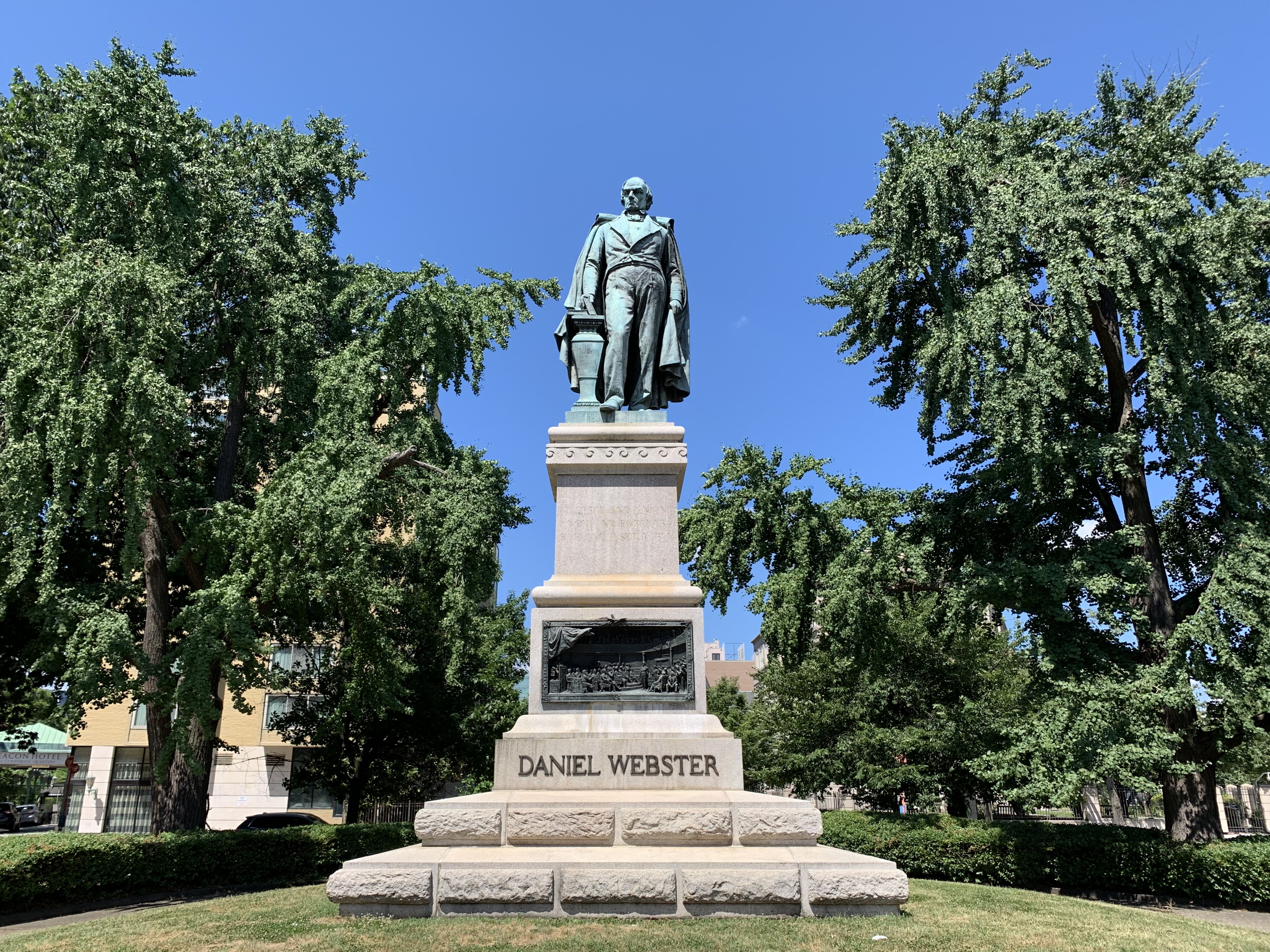
Daniel Webster Memorial, Scott Circle

- St. John's Episcopal Church, 1525 H Street NW: Located on the northwest corner of 16th and H Streets, this Greek Revival church was built in 1816 and designed by Benjamin Henry Latrobe. Nicknamed the "Church of the Presidents", every president since James Madison has attended at least one service at St. John's. The church was designated an NHL in 1960 and added to the DCIHS in 1970. In addition to the Sixteenth Street Historic District, the church is also a contributing property to the Lafayette Square Historic District, which was designated an NHL District in 1970.
- University Club (originally the Racquet Club), 1135 16th Street NW; Jules Henri de Sibour also designed this neoclassical private club, built in 1920 for Harry Wardman. It was added to the NRHP and DCIHS in 2024.
- National Geographic Society Headquarters, 1156 16th Street NW and 1145 17th Street NW; The neoclassical original building, Hubbard Memorial Hall, was constructed in 1902 and designed by Hornblower & Marshall. A Renaissance Revival addition designed by Arthur B. Heaton was built in 1913. Heaton also designed the adjoining neoclassical administrative building that was completed in 1932. The buildings were added to the DCIHS in 2022 and listed on the NRHP in 2023.
- Carnegie Institution of Washington Administration Building, 1530 P Street NW: The Carnegie Institution for Science is located in this Beaux-Arts building on the southeast corner of 16th and P Streets. It was designed by the Carrère and Hastings architectural firm and completed in 1910, with funding provided by Andrew Carnegie. The building was added to the DCIHS in 1964 and designated an NHL in 1965.
- Robert Simpson Woodward House, 1513 16th Street NW: Robert Simpson Woodward, a geologist, mathematician, and first president of the Carnegie Institution for Science, lived in the house from 1904 to 1914. The Richardsonian Romanesque house was built in 1895 and designed by William M. Conley. It currently serves as offices for the think tank Capital Research Center. The building was designated an NHL in 1976 and added to the DCIHS in 1979.
- The St. Regis Washington, D.C. (historically known as the Carlton Hotel), 923 16th Street NW; This Beaux-Arts luxury hotel, designed by architect Mihran Mesrobian, was built in 1926 for real estate developer Harry Wardman. In addition to its architectural significance, the hotel was added to the NRHP for its role as the official reception venue for President Harry S. Truman during White House renovations. Frequent guests included Howard Hughes, Katharine Hepburn, and General John J. Pershing. The hotel was added to the DCIHS in 1964 and listed on the NRHP in 1990.
- Daniel Webster Memorial, Reservation 62; The bronze neoclassical monument to lawyer and statesman Daniel Webster is located on the west side of Scott Circle. Sculpted by Gaetano Trentanove, the statue was commissioned by Stilson Hutchins, founder of The Washington Post, and given to the federal government. The memorial was listed on the NRHP and added to the DCIHS in 2007.
- Brevet Lt. General Winfield Scott, Reservation 63; This equestrian sculpture of career military officer Winfield Scott is sited in the center of Scott Circle. Installed in 1874 and sculpted by Henry Kirke Brown, it is considered one of the worst equestrian sculptures in the city due to its proportions. The sculpture is one of 18 Civil War Monuments in Washington, D.C. that were collectively listed on the NRHP in 1978 and added to the DCIHS in 1979.
- Samuel Hahnemann Monument, Reservation 64; The neoclassical monument honoring Samuel Hahnemann, the founder of homeopathy, was dedicated in 1900. It is located on the east side of Scott Circle. The elaborate monument, designed by Julius Harder, features a statue of Hahnemann sculpted by Charles Henry Niehaus, a mosaic, and reliefs. The monument was listed on the NRHP and added to the DCIHS in 2007.
- Congressional Club, 2001 New Hampshire Avenue NW; Constructed in 1917 and designed by George Oakley Totten Jr., the neoclassical building is a clubhouse for congressional spouses. As part of her effort to enhance the area of 16th Street near her stone mansion, nicknamed Henderson's Castle, Mary Foote Henderson played a large role in the design and location of the building.

=== Other contributing properties ===
==== South of Scott Circle ====
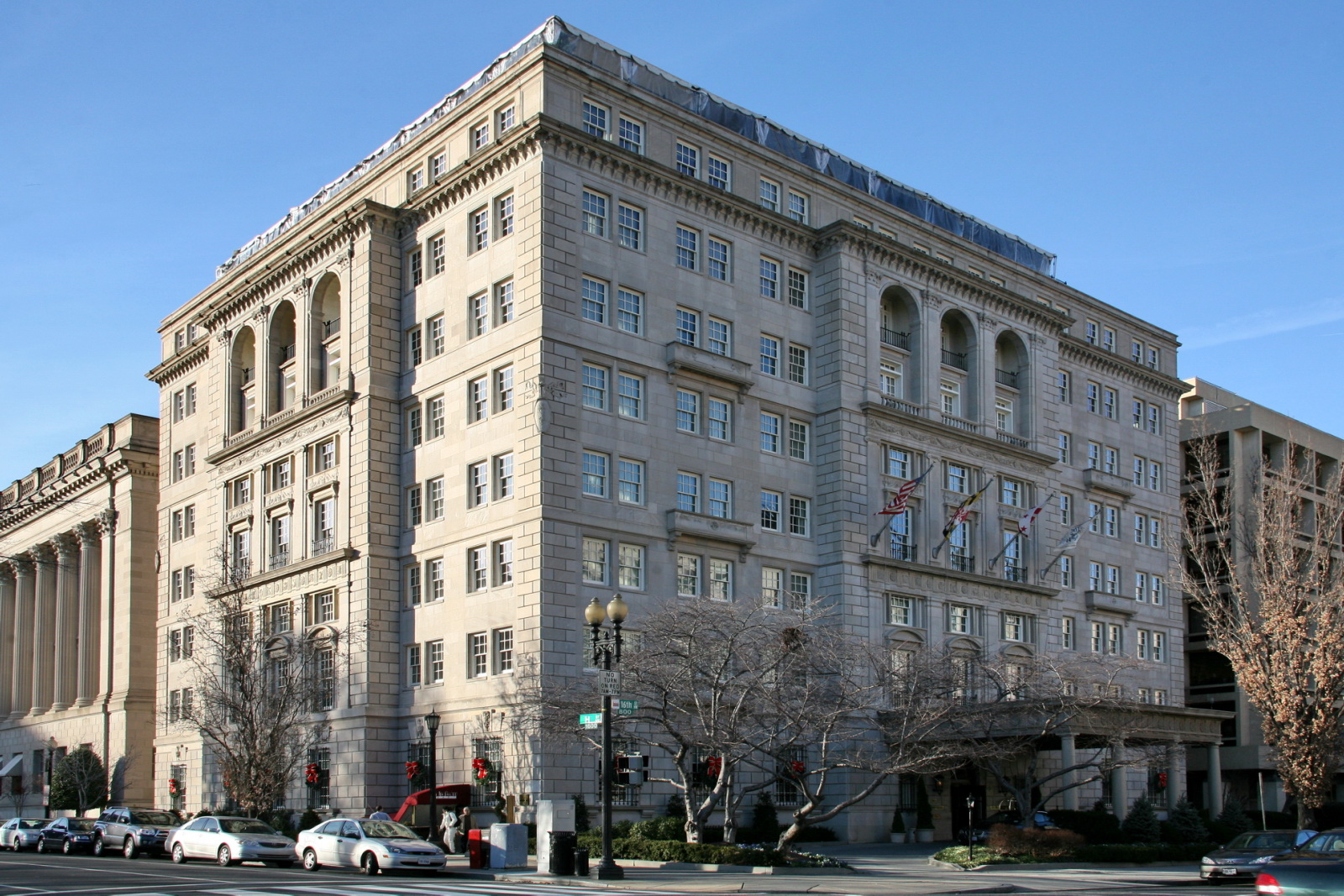
Hay–Adams Hotel, 800 16th Street NW

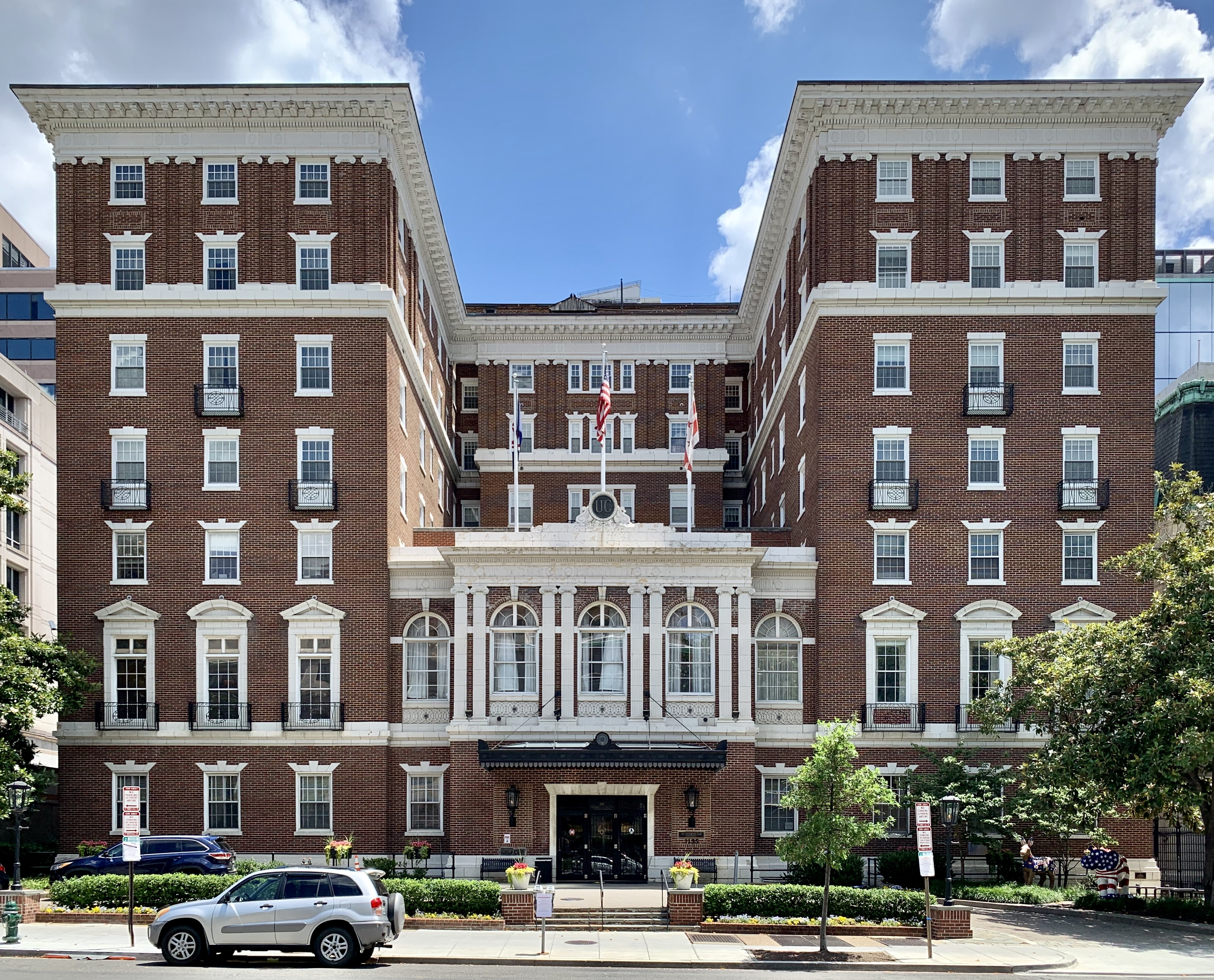
University Club, 1135 16th Street NW

- Hay–Adams Hotel, 800 16th Street NW; A luxury hotel built in 1927 as an apartment annex to the Carlton Hotel, the Renaissance Revival Hay-Adams was also designed by Mihran Mesrobian for Harry Wardman. Mesrobian used the Palazzo Farnese in Rome as inspiration for the exterior design. The hotel was built on the site of large adjoining homes designed by Henry Hobson Richardson for John Hay and Henry Adams.
- Capital Hilton (historically known as the Hotel Statler), 1001 16th Street NW; This early modernist hotel opened in 1943 and was designed by Holabird & Root for the Statler Hotel company. When it first opened, the Hotel Statler was the largest air-conditioned hotel in the world.
- The Presidential, 1026 16th Street NW; Appleton P. Clark Jr. designed this apartment building turned co-op that opened in 1922. The Presidential is one of the last residential buildings in an area of downtown that is now mostly commercial. The building is listed in local historian James M. Goode's book Best Addresses: A Century of Washington’s Distinguished Apartment Houses where he mentions "Because of its location, as well as its service features, the Presidential was one of the most desirable Washington apartment houses in 1929."
- The Pall Mall, 1112 16th Street NW; Built in 1940, this apartment building turned office space now known as the Calomiris Building, was designed by Robert O. Scholz, whose works include Alban Towers and Milton Hall. The architectural style is a combination of Renaissance Revival and Art Deco, which complements neighboring buildings that were constructed in the early 20th century.
- Russian ambassador's residence, 1125 16th Street NW; The Beaux-Arts ambassadorial residence was originally built for the widow of George Pullman. It is one of the largest and last remaining single-family houses still standing on this stretch of 16th Street. The house was built in 1910 and designed by Nathan C. Wyeth. For most of its history the building served as the USSR Embassy (now Russian Embassy). The property includes two adjoining buildings, one built in 1910, and a former house built in 1893. The embassy was added to the DCIHS in 1964.
- Mitchell House, 1128 16th Street NW; Built in 1909, this Beaux-Arts house was designed by Bruce Price and Jules Henri de Sibour for Mitchell Harrison. Previous occupants include Frederic Adrian Delano and Sigma Alpha Epsilon. The building currently serves as offices for the Congressional Hispanic Caucus Institute.
- The Jefferson, 1200 16th Street NW; Originally a luxury apartment building, The Jefferson now serves as a luxury boutique hotel. The Beaux-Arts building was constructed in 1922 and designed by Jules Henri de Sibour.
- Alonzo Bliss House, 1218 16th Street NW; One of the most elaborate houses remaining south of Scott Circle, this Beaux-Arts building was designed by Albert Goenner and completed in 1907. It currently serves as the Chinese American Museum.

==== North of Scott Circle ====
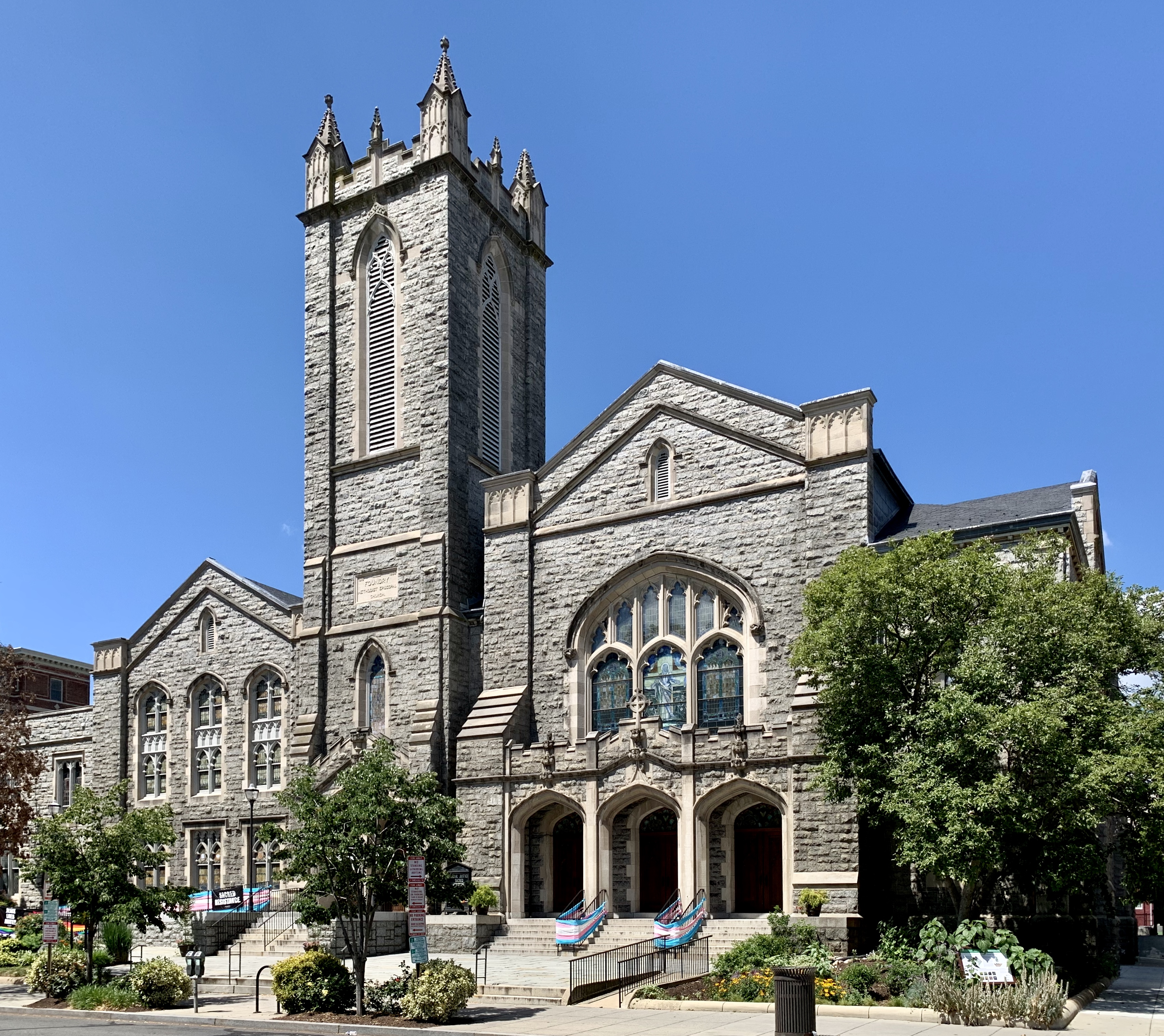
Foundry United Methodist Church, 1500 16th Street NW

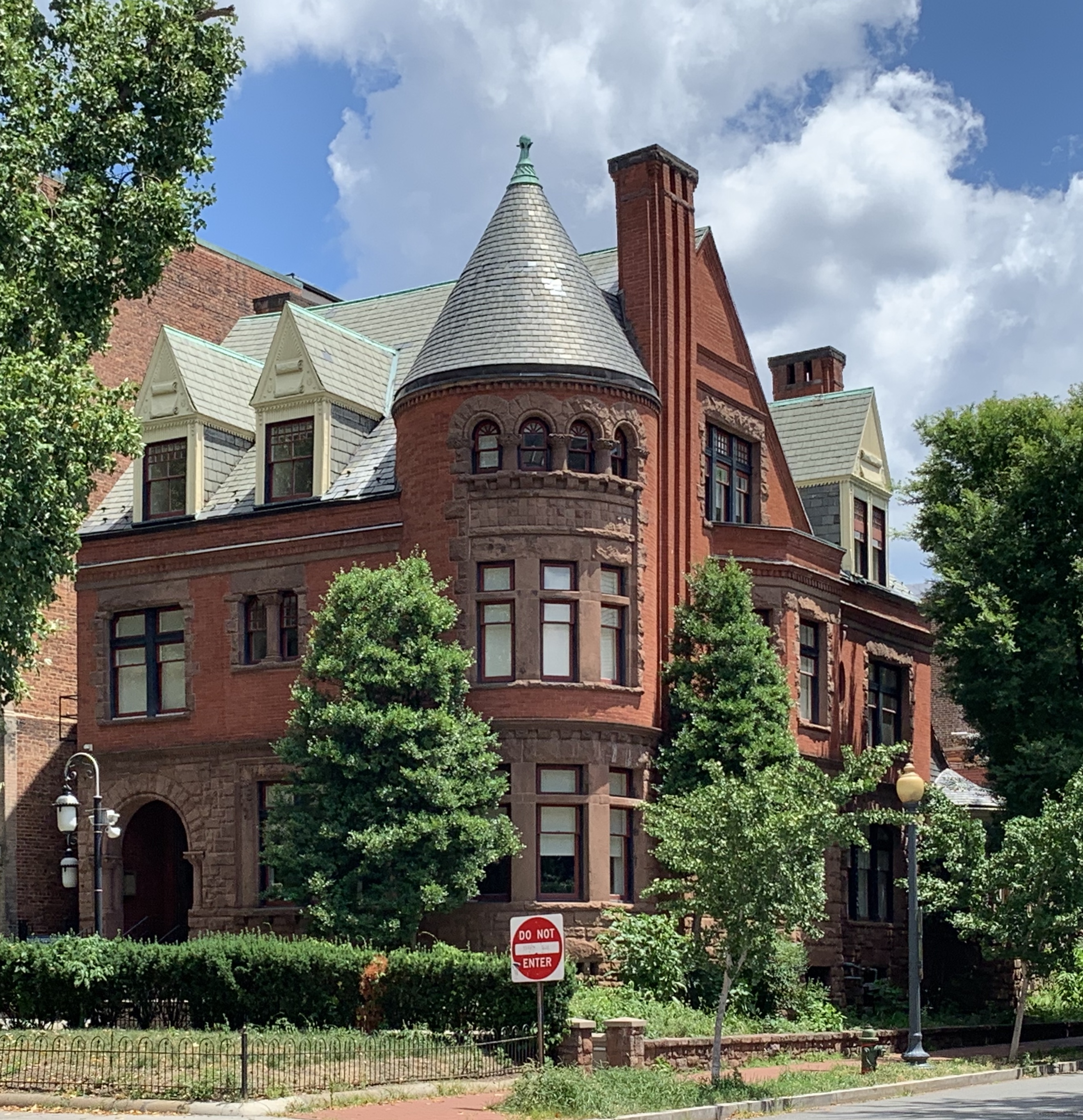
Hampton P. Denman House, 1623 16th Street NW

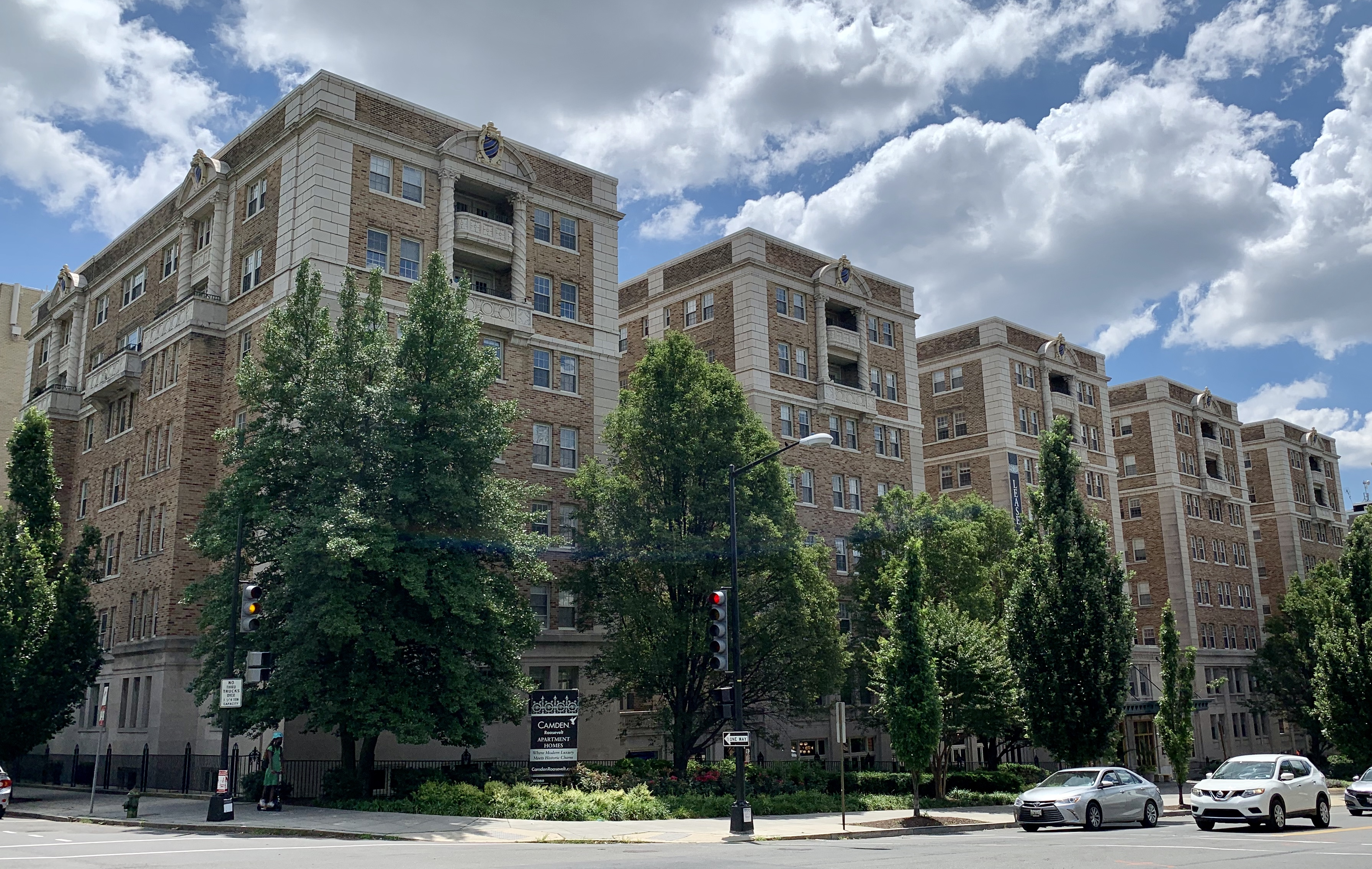
Camden Roosevelt, 2101 16th Street NW

- The General Scott, 1 Scott Circle NW; Designed by Robert O. Scholz, this Art Deco apartment building on the northeast corner of Scott Circle was completed in 1941. Three elaborate homes were demolished to make way for the General Scott, including the Pendleton House, which was considered the best residential address in the 1880s. When the Sixteenth Street Historic District was listed in 1978, the General Scott was considered a non-contributing property. In 2007, when the historic district was expanded, the building was deemed a contributing property.
- First Baptist Church, 1328 16th Street NW; The Gothic Revival church, built in 1955, was designed by Walter Horstmann Thomas and Harold E. Wagoner. The church's previous building on the same site was a grand Romanesque Revival structure with a 140-foot (43 m) tower that was an area landmark. It was demolished due to the congregation outgrowing the old sanctuary.
- Embassy of Kazakhstan (historically known as the Sherman House or Shields-Scully House), 1401 16th Street NW; The Richardsonian Romanesque house, built in 1888 for Susan Hart Shields, was designed by Samuel Edmonston. Previous owners include Vice President James S. Sherman, Senator Thomas F. Bayard Jr., and the Netherlands legation.
- The Embassy, 1424 16th Street NW; Constructed in 1917 and designed by Appleton P. Clark Jr., The Embassy was originally an apartment building and later served as office space. Previous tenants include the Grenadian, Hungarian, and Salvadoran legations. The Embassy now houses the new Founding Church of Scientology; the museum of the historic Founding Church of Scientology is nearby.
- Foundry United Methodist Church, 1500 16th Street NW; This Gothic Revival church, designed by Appleton P. Clark, Jr., was built in 1904. The annex on the corner of 16th and P Streets was built in the 1960s in the same architectural style. It replaced the massive Foraker House, designed by Paul J. Pelz, that was purchased in 1929 and used as Sunday School classrooms.
- The Alturas, 1509 16th Street NW; This Italianate building was constructed in 1909 and designed by Averill, Hall & Adams. It originally served as an apartment building and later a hotel.
- Charles L. Marlatt House, 1521 16th Street NW; The Arts and Crafts building was completed in 1909 and designed by Lemuel Norris, whose works include the Walsh Stable and Nathaniel Parker Gage School. The Marlatt family continued ownership until the building was purchased by the Soviet government for additional embassy office space. It now houses the Institute of World Politics.
- Edlavitch Jewish Community Center, 1529 16th Street NW; This building, designed by B. Stanley Simmons and completed in 1926, is considered an excellent example of neoclassical architecture. It served the local Jewish community for a few decades before being sold to the University of the District of Columbia. The DCJCC repurchased the building in 1990 and spent $13 million to restore it.
- Hightowers Apartments, 1530 16th Street NW; The Art Deco building was constructed in 1938 and designed by Alvin L. Aubinoe and Harry L. Edwards. In Best Addresses, James M. Goode described the Hightowers and another apartment building they designed, the Majestic on 16th Street NW in Mount Pleasant, as "among the finest streamlined Art Deco buildings in the city."
- 1601-1609 16th Street NW; The Huntley House at 1601 is considered "one of the finest examples of the Italian bracketed style still standing" in the historic district. It was built in 1878 along with a stable on Q Street that is one of the oldest surviving stables in the city. The adjoining homes, 1603–1607, were built around the same time by the same person, but the exteriors were altered at a later date. The row of homes represent a mixture of styles and are prime examples of residential architecture in the historic district: 1603 was designed in the Georgian Revival style by J. C. Harkness, 1605 is Italianate and also designed by Harkness, 1607 is Richardsonian Romanesque and was designed by Thomas Franklin Schneider, and 1609 is Arts and Crafts designed by Appleton P. Clark, Jr.
- Church of the Holy City (Swedenborgian), 1611 16th Street NW; The Gothic Revival church, designed by Paul J. Pelz, was built in 1896 and features several Tiffany stained glass windows. The church's 158-foot (48 m) tower was inspired by the Great Tower at Magdalen College, Oxford.
- Hampton P. Denman House (also known as the Denman-Werlich House), 1623 16th Street NW; The Richardsonian Romanesque house, built in 1886 for Hampton P. Denman, was designed by Albert W. Fuller and William A. Wheeler. For several decades it was the home of socialite Gladys Hinckley Werlich, who was murdered on a sidewalk near the house in 1976. For 30 years the building housed the Green Door mental health clinic before being purchased by the current owner, the Scientology organization Social Betterment Properties International.
- National Association of Colored Women's Clubs (NACWC) headquarters, 1601 R Street NW (corner of 16th and R Streets); Built in 1910 for naval commander Richard T. Mulligan, this large five-story mansion was designed by Jules Henri de Sibour and is considered an excellent example of Colonial Revival architecture. It was previously owned by Cissy Patterson before she moved into the Patterson Mansion.
- The Chastleton, 1701 16th Street NW; Constructed in 1919 and designed by Philip M. Jullien, the Chastleton is one of the largest residential buildings in the historic district. The Gothic Revival building features gargoyles and spires. Previous occupants include General Douglas MacArthur and Wallis Simpson.
- Toutorsky Mansion (also known as the Brown-Toutorsky House), 1720 16th Street NW; This Flemish Revival house, designed by William Henry Miller, was built in 1894 for Supreme Court Justice Henry Billings Brown. It later housed offices for the Persian legation and the Zionist Organization of America. For 42 years the building was owned by Russian concert pianist Basil Peter Toutorsky and his wife, opera singer Maria Ignacia Howard Toutorsky, and the couple operated the Toutorsky Academy of Music out of their residence. The building was deeded to the Peabody Conservatory but now serves as the Embassy of the Republic of the Congo.
- House of the Temple, 1733 16th Street NW; The large, imposing headquarters of the Masonic Supreme Council, Scottish Rite (Southern Jurisdiction, USA) was designed by John Russell Pope and completed in 1915. The neoclassical building was modeled after the Mausoleum at Halicarnassus, one of the Seven Wonders of the Ancient World. It includes the city's first public library, the remains of Albert Pike, and one of the largest collection of materials related to Robert Burns. The building was added to the DCIHS in 1964.
- Somerset House, 1801 16th Street NW; Frank Russell White designed this apartment building for Harry Wardman in 1916. Somerset House is one of six apartment buildings that White designed in this area of 16th Street, the others being The Saint Mihiel (1712 16th Street NW, built 1920), The Ambassador (1750 16th Street NW, built 1920), The Lealand (1830 16th Street NW; built 1914), The Howard (1842 16th Street NW, built 1913), and The Tiffany (1925 16th Street NW, built 1922).
- Universalist National Memorial Church, 1810 16th Street NW; The Romanesque Revival church was designed by Allen & Collens and completed in 1930. It features a 102-foot (31 m) tower.
- The Balfour (historically known as The Westover), 2000 16th Street NW; Constructed in 1900 and designed by George S. Cooper in the Renaissance Revival style, it was one of the first luxury apartment buildings erected near Meridian Hill Park.
- Embassy of Angola, 2100 and 2108 16th Street NW; Built in 1911 and designed by George Oakley Totten Jr., 2100 16th Street was originally the home of Supreme Court Justice Charles Evans Hughes and he resided here during his 1916 presidential campaign. It later served as the Bulgarian embassy. The house next door, 2108 16th Street, was built in 1898 and designed by William Johnston Marsh, whose works include the William Syphax School, Randall Junior High School, and Evening Star Building.
- Camden Roosevelt (also known as The Roosevelt), 2101 16th Street NW; The largest apartment building in the historic district, the Camden Roosevelt was originally called The Hadleigh, but was renamed in honor of Theodore Roosevelt. The imposing Renaissance Revival building, completed in 1920 and designed by Appleton P. Clark Jr., features five identical wings.

== See also ==
- History of Washington, D.C.
- National Register of Historic Places listings in Washington, D.C.
- Architecture of Washington, D.C.
