= Administration Building, Carnegie Institution of Washington =

Building in Washington, D.C.

- Administration Building, Carnegie Institute of Washington
- U.S. National Register of Historic Places
- U.S. National Historic Landmark
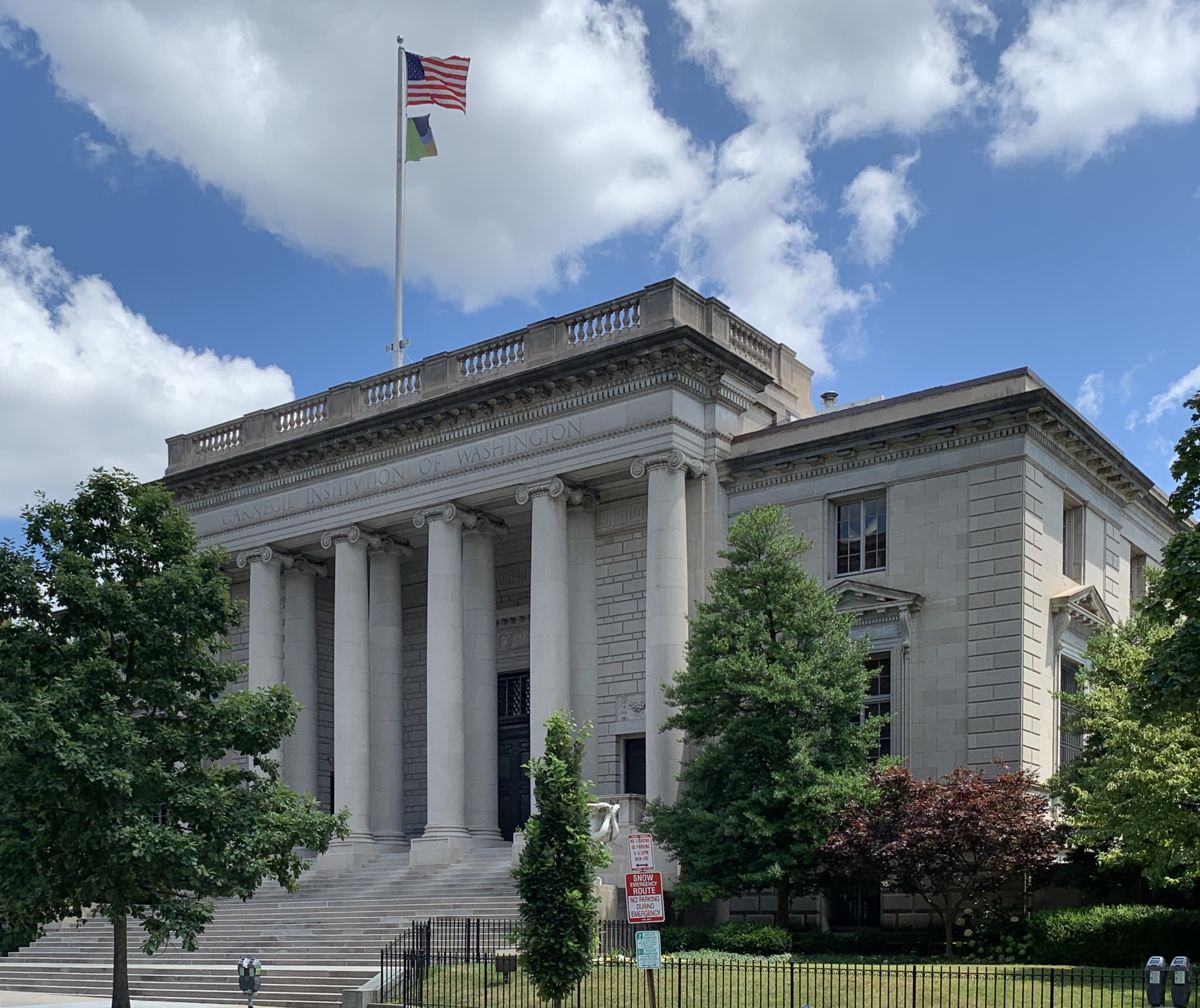
- Administration Building in 2020

- Location within Washington, D.C.
- Location: 1530 P Street, N.W., Washington, D.C.
- Coordinates: 38.909454°N 77.036237°W
- Area: 0.5 acres (0.20 ha)
- Built: 1910
- Architect: Carrere and Hastings (original); William Adams Delano (modifications)
- Architectural style: Beaux-Arts
- NRHP reference No.: 66000959

Significant dates
- Added to NRHP: October 15, 1966
- Designated NHL: June 23, 1965

The Administration Building, Carnegie Institute of Washington is a Beaux-Arts style building designed by architects Carrere and Hastings, and located at 1530 P Street NW in Washington, D.C. It housed the Carnegie Institution for Science, a philanthropic scientific research organization founded in 1902 by Andrew Carnegie, until 2021. In recognition of the building's architecture and its unique tenant, the building was declared a National Historic Landmark in 1965. The building was also designated a contributing property to the Sixteenth Street Historic District in 1978. Since October 2025, it has served as the Embassy of Qatar.

== Description and history ==
The building is located in Washington's Dupont Circle neighborhood, north of Scott Circle at the southeast corner of 16th and P Streets NW. It is a large and roughly rectangular structure, two stories in height, its exterior finished in Indiana limestone. Facing west toward 16th Street is its monumental front facade, with ten full-height Ionic columns (six in front and four in the center) supporting an entablature and flat balustraded roof. The original main building was basically square, with small flanking wings. To this a rear addition was made in 1937, using similar materials and design. The interior houses offices and meeting spaces, as well as a 450-seat auditorium.

Andrew Carnegie established the Carnegie Institute of Washington in 1902 with an endowment of $10 million. The front portion of the building, designed by Carrere and Hastings, was built in 1910, and the rear addition, built in 1937, was designed by William Adams Delano. The building presently houses administrative functions of the Institute, which has its primary research functions elsewhere. The organization's mission is to fund talented individuals so that they can perform basic research for the betterment of mankind without significant constraints.

On April 2, 2021, Carnegie president Eric Isaacs announced that the building had been sold to Qatar for an undisclosed sum. On October 25, 2025, the building was inaugurated as the Embassy of Qatar.

== See also ==
- List of National Historic Landmarks in Washington, D.C.
- National Register of Historic Places listings in the upper NW Quadrant of Washington, D.C.
