= Ozark pudding =

Custard with fruit and nuts

- Type: Custard
- Place of origin: United States
- Region or state: Missouri
- Main ingredients: custard, nuts

Ozark pudding is a dry fruit custard with nuts that appears to originate in Missouri, being named after The Ozarks region. It is most famous for being a favorite food of President Harry Truman, a recipe by his wife Bess Truman having been widely published in the 1950s as her contribution to the Congressional Club Cookbook.

== Ingredients and preparation ==
Ozark pudding always contains fruit and nuts, which comprises most of its volume, with the custard only serving as a glue between the packed bits.

== History ==
According to the book All American Desserts, the predecessor for Ozark pudding, gateau aux noisettes (cake with hazelnuts), was brought to the New World by the French Huguenots who settled in Charleston, South Carolina. Because hazelnuts were not common in the US, pecans were used, and it came to be known as Huguenot torte. By the time the recipe reached the Ozarks and acquired its current name, black walnuts were a common alternative to pecans.

== See also ==
- Mayfair salad dressing, specialty at a St. Louis hotel that Truman stayed at
- List of custard desserts
