= Congressional Club =

Historic Washington, D.C. club

- Type: Social club
- Tax ID no.: 53-0050970
- Website: www.thecongressionalclub.com
- Congressional Club
- U.S. National Register of Historic Places
- U.S. Historic district – Contributing property
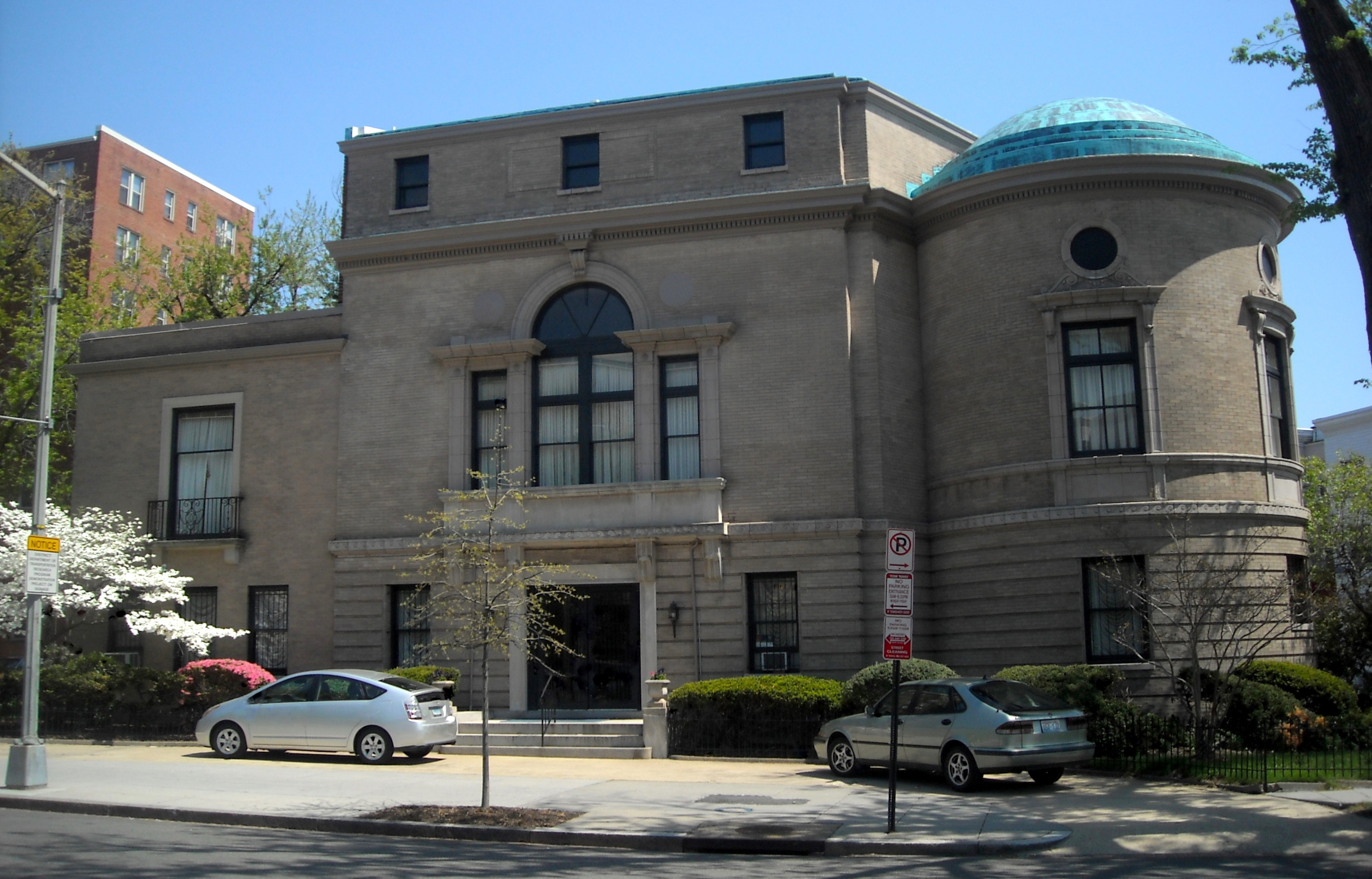
- Congressional Club in 2009

- Location within Washington, D.C.
- Location: 2001 New Hampshire Avenue NW; Washington, D.C. United States
- Coordinates: 38°55′10″N 77°2′8″W
- Built: 1914
- Architect: George Oakley Totten Jr.
- Architectural style: neoclassical
- Part of: Sixteenth Street Historic District (ID78003060)
- NRHP reference No.: 11000717

Significant dates
- Added to NRHP: October 6, 2011
- Designated CP: August 25, 1978

The Congressional Club (founded in 1908) is an historic clubhouse located at 2001 New Hampshire Avenue NW, Washington, D.C., in the U Street Corridor. The organization it hosts, which is the official club of congressional spouses, was created in May 1908 with the Sixtieth Congress passage of HR22029. The Congressional Club is the only club in the world to be incorporated by an act of Congress. Since 1912, the club has hosted a luncheon honoring the First Lady of the United States. It is the largest annual event sponsored by the Club.

== House ==
Built in 1917, the neoclassical clubhouse is designated a contributing property to the Sixteenth Street Historic District, an historic district listed on the National Register of Historic Places in 1978. The building was individually listed on the Register in 2011. Designed by George Oakley Totten Jr., the building is a clubhouse for congressional spouses. As part of her effort to enhance the area of 16th Street near her stone mansion, nicknamed Henderson Castle, social activist and real estate developer Mary Foote Henderson played a large role in the design and location of the building.

== Cookbook ==
The major fundraiser of the club is the Congressional Club Cookbook, or C^{3}. It contains recipes from the members, for example Bess Truman's Ozark pudding.

== See also ==
- National Register of Historic Places listings in Washington, D.C.
