= University Club of Washington, D.C. =

Coordinates: 38°54′17.7″N 77°02′09.5″W

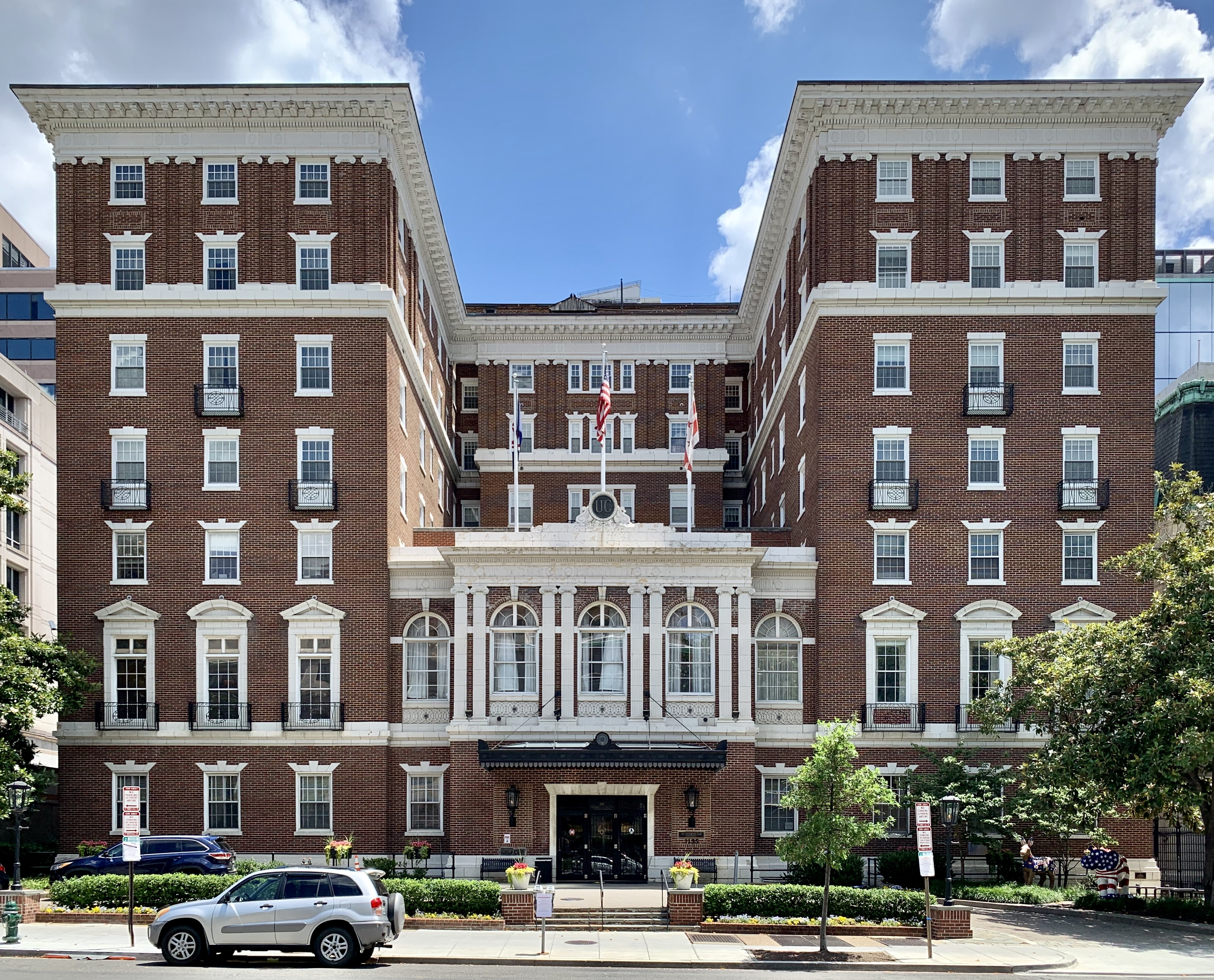
- Formation: 1904; 122 years ago
- Type: Private club
- Location: Washington, D.C.
- Services: Hotel, Dining, Athletics, Meetings
- Website: www.universityclubdc.com

The University Club of Washington, D.C., is an American private club in downtown Washington, D.C..

== History ==
The first organizational meeting of The University Club of Washington, DC was held at the new Willard Hotel on February 22, 1904. A historic spot in its own right, the Willard had just reopened (the first time). Sixty-six university and college alumni gathered to form The University Club - 24 other cities had already formed such clubs. The first Clubhouse was located at 1726 I Street, NW. On the evening of March 11, 1904, the first President elected was then Secretary of War, William Howard Taft, an active Club member. Later the Club moved into its new quarters, a brownstone at 930 Sixteenth Street, NW. The Club developed a most appropriate theme: "Enter all of ye who have a degree of good fellowship and learning."

In 1936, it merged with the Racquet Club of Washington, and moved to its current location at 1135 Sixteenth Street NW, approximately three blocks north of the White House. The 16th Street building was listed on the National Register of Historic Places in 2024.

During the Warren Court justices Earl Warren and Hugo Black would often use the Club's facilities to informally discuss and gather.

== Reciprocity ==
The Club has reciprocal agreements for its members with approximately 200 other athletic, country, and city clubs around the United States and the world.

== Athletics ==
The Club contains a health and fitness center including two international squash courts where it hosts the annual Mosquito Open. The Tewaaraton Award was founded at the Club in 2000 and is presented annually to the NCAA Lacrosse player of the year. It is the lacrosse equivalent of football's Heisman Trophy. The trophy is presented jointly by The Tewaaraton Foundation and the University Club of Washington, D.C.. One trophy is presented to the top men's player, and one trophy is presented to the top women's player each year.

== Notable members ==
Notable past and current Club members include former Speaker of the House Tip O'Neill, former President Richard Nixon, numerous Supreme Court Justices, former Homeland Security Secretary Tom Ridge, FBI Director J. Edgar Hoover, President Taft's great-granddaughter Patricia Taft, and former Secretary of Defense Donald Rumsfeld.

== See also ==
- Cosmos Club
- List of American gentlemen's clubs
- Metropolitan Club (Washington, D.C.)
- Sixteenth Street Historic District
