= Toutorsky Mansion =

Coordinates: 38.913502°N 77.036886°W

- U.S. Historic district – Contributing property
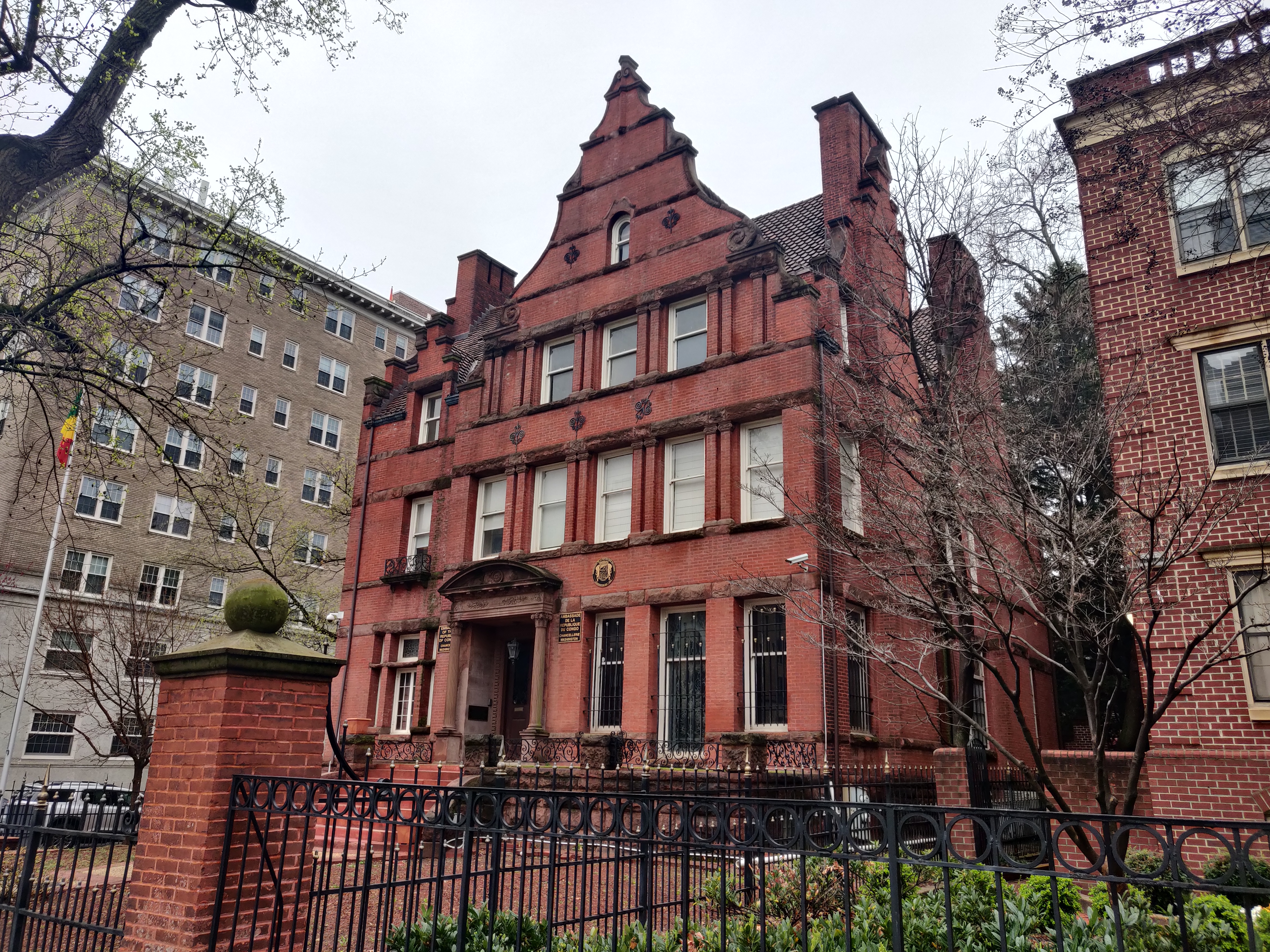
- Location: 1720 16th Street, NW; Washington, D.C., United States
- Architect: William Henry Miller
- Architectural style: Flemish Revival
- Part of: Sixteenth Street Historic District (ID78003060)
- Designated CP: August 25, 1978

The Toutorsky Mansion, also called the Brown-Toutorsky House, is a five-story, 18-room house located at 1720 16th Street, NW in the Dupont Circle neighborhood of Washington, D.C. Since 2012, it has housed the Embassy of the Republic of the Congo.

The 12,000-square-foot (1,100 m^{2}) mansion was completed in 1894 for U.S. Supreme Court Justice Henry Billings Brown. Brown spent $65,000 ($2,418,750 today) to build the house, including $25,000 to buy the land from the Riggs family in 1891.

The house was designed by architect William Henry Miller, the first graduate of Cornell University’s School of Architecture, who modeled the exterior on 16th-century Flemish buildings, and the interior using a mixture of Gothic, Elizabethan, Jacobean, and Colonial elements. The building's exterior features intricate and unique Ludowici tile and the interior contains eight fireplaces and a main staircase featuring hand-carved griffins. "With its stepped and scroll-edged gables, insistent rows of windows, dark red brick, and strong horizontal stone courses, it is a rare iteration of Renaissance Flemish architecture in a city whose architectural ancestry is overwhelmingly English and French,” according to the AIA Guide to the Architecture of Washington, D.C.

The house is a contributing property to the Sixteenth Street Historic District and may not be demolished or significantly altered without permission from the city’s Historic Preservation Review Board.

== History ==
The mansion "provided shelter for some of the most profound deliberations and negotiations in the nation’s history”. While living at the house, Justice Brown wrote the segregation-justifying Plessy v. Ferguson decision. Brown lived in the house until his 1913 death in New York.

The house had several owners over the next several decades. From 1924 to 1927, the mansion was rented to the Persian Legation to the United States.

In 1942, the house was purchased by the Zionist Organization of America, which pushed the U.S. government, Congress, and the American public to recognize Israel in 1948. The group, which used the building as its headquarters through 1947, moved some interior walls to create better office spaces.

=== Toutorsky purchase ===
The house was purchased in 1947 by Basil Peter Toutorsky. Born in 1896 in Novocherkassk, Russia, Toutorsky was a hereditary nobleman who had studied law at the prestigious Moscow University and music at the Moscow Conservatory of Music. He served in the Imperial Russian Navy during World War I, surviving the explosion of the Russian battleship Empress Maria in the Black Sea in 1916; then fought for the White Russians who tried to overthrow the October Revolution. In 1920, he fled from the Crimea to Turkey and arrived in the United States in 1923. With his wife of 11 years, the Mexican opera singer Maria Ignacia Howard Toutorsky, he opened the Toutorsky Academy of Music and ran it for nearly four decades.

Among the furnishings were collections of dolls; swans; World War I medals, decorations and uniforms; stuffed wild animals; a pedestal displaying under glass, Toutorsky claimed, Napoleon’s hat; a balalaika; a polar bear carpet; Persian carpets and tapestries; heavy antique furniture; and 21 pianos, including a Bechstein concert grand on which Franz Liszt had played. Toutorsky had studied piano with Liszt himself. One of the violin teachers he employed was Marius Thor.

In November 1988, the Toutorskys bequeathed the house to Johns Hopkins University’s Peabody Conservatory of Music in exchange for an annuity and lifetime use of the mansion’s carriage house.

=== Post-Toutorskys ===
After Maria’s death in 1988 and Basil’s in 1989, the university rented some rooms to students for $1 a month to keep the house occupied. University officials sought $1.5 million for the house, but ultimately sold it in December 1990 for $808,000 and used the proceeds to endow a piano studio and a scholarship fund named for Toutorsky.

The buyer was Bruce Johnson, who owned a Dupont Circle firm that performed historic renovations. He pronounced it fundamentally sound, and planned some painting, patching and plastering. Ultimately, he added air-conditioning and bathrooms. The building received much restoration and cosmetic work in preparation for a 1992 fundraising event called ”National Symphony Orchestra Decorators' Show House.” Johnson used the building to host other community events, meetings and other gatherings. These included ”Broadway Cares” benefits for AIDS/HIV research and treatment that featured live performances by cast members of ”Angels in America” and other shows visiting the Kennedy Center. Johnson and his partner Keith Kreger also rented out rooms in the house to members of the DC LGBT community, celebrated authors, political biographers, writers for national publications, political organizers, and others.

In 2001, realtor Humberto Gonzalez bought the property for $2.2 million. He sought to run it as a 16-room bed-and-breakfast inn and event venue, but nearby residents objected, and the city ultimately granted him a license to offer just six rooms for rent. In 2008, Gonzalez began seeking to sell the mansion.

In February 2011, Gonzalez sold the house for $5.75 million to the Republic of the Congo, which announced plans to move its embassy to the property. In subsequent hearings before the Foreign Mission Board of Zoning Adjustment, which rules on applications to locate embassies, Congolese government officials asked to add a driveway to the front yard. The board rejected the request, and the officials promised not to pave over the front yard, whereupon the board approved the application to move the embassy. In September, Congo broke their promise, paving the front yard with concrete and removing three large trees in the process. The Congolese government was then ordered by the U.S. State Department and the District of Columbia Department of Transportation to remove the concrete and restore the yard by December 17. Congo began complying with the order on the deadline day.
