= Universalist National Memorial Church =

Historic church in Washington, D.C., United States

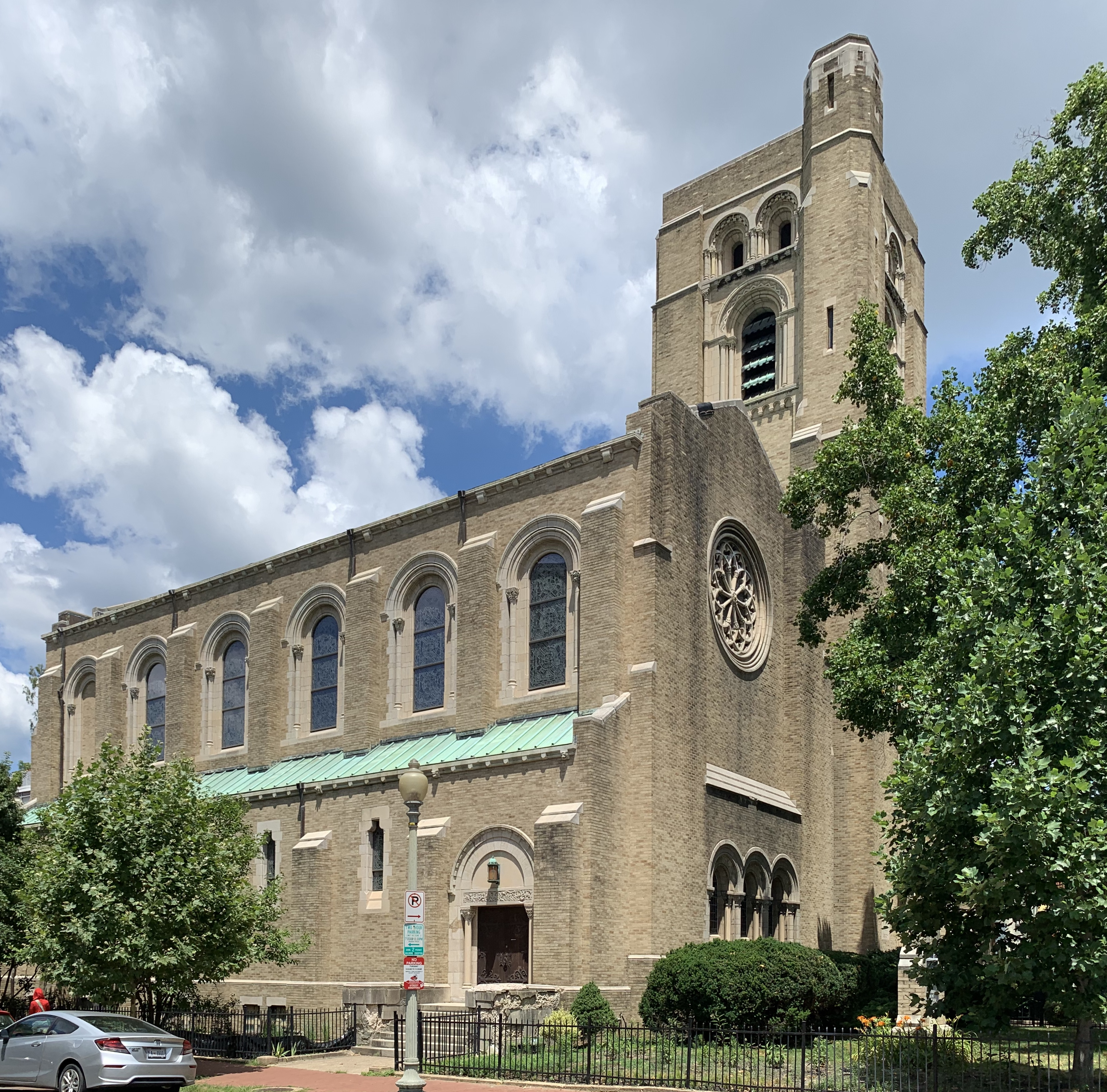
- Universalist National Memorial Church in 2020, as seen facing 16th Street Northwest
- Universalist National Memorial Church
- 38.914289°N 77.036712°W
- Location: Washington, D. C.
- Country: United States
- Denomination: Unitarian Universalist Association
- Previous denomination: Universalist Church of America
- Website: universalist.org

History
- Status: Cathedral
- Founded: 1930

Architecture
- Functional status: Active
- Architect: Allen & Collens
- Architectural type: Cathedral
- Style: Romanesque Revival

Clergy
- Pastor: David Gatton

Universalist National Memorial Church (UNMC) is a Unitarian Universalist church located at 1810 16th Street, Northwest in the Dupont Circle vicinage of Washington, D.C. Theologically, the church describes itself as "both liberal Christian and Universalist". Originally a member of the Universalist Church of America, it became a member of the Unitarian Universalist Association (UUA) in 1961 when the former merged with the American Unitarian Association to form the UUA, and in 2003, UNMC strengthened its ties to the UUA.

== History ==
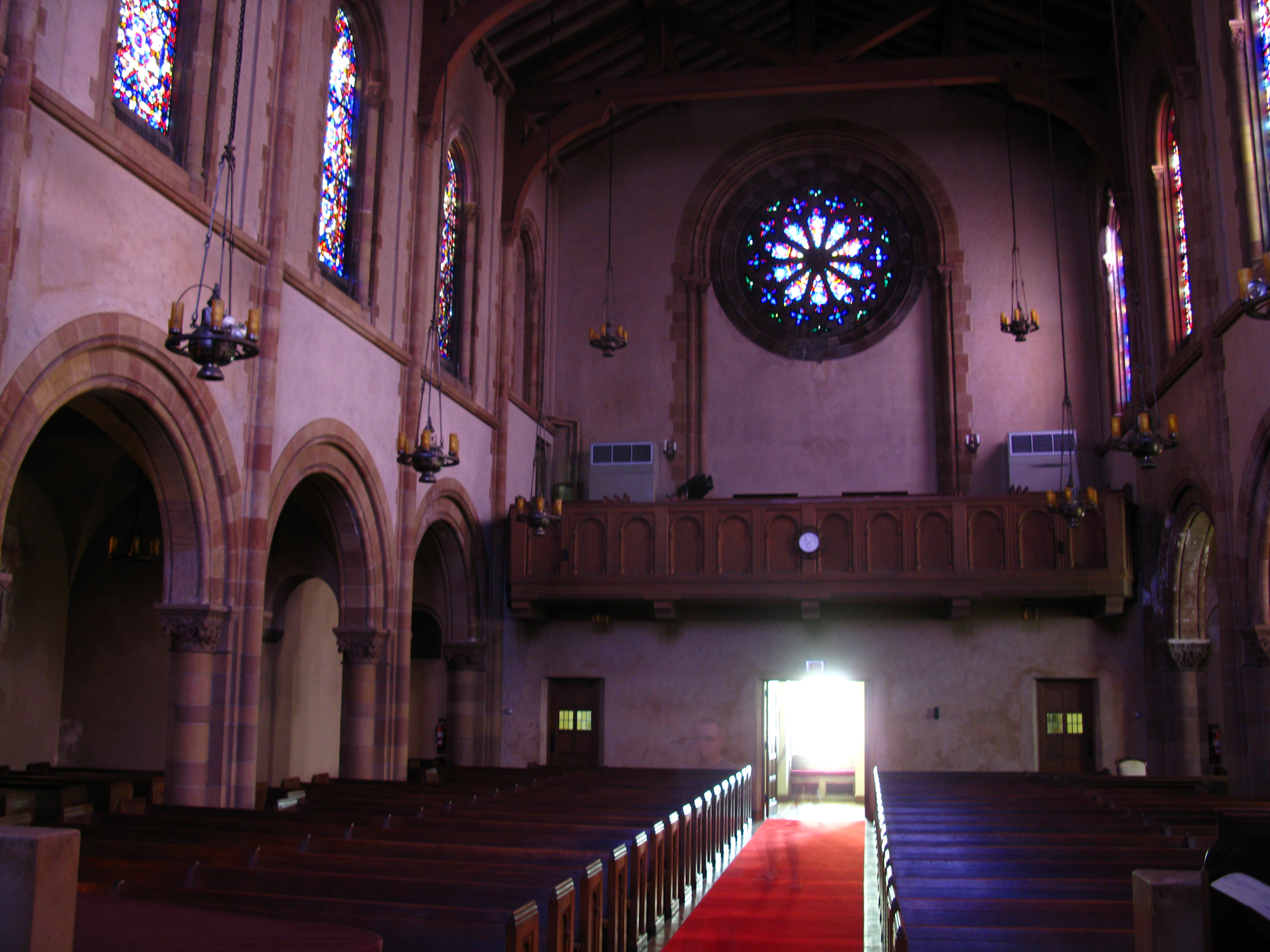
UNMC sanctuary

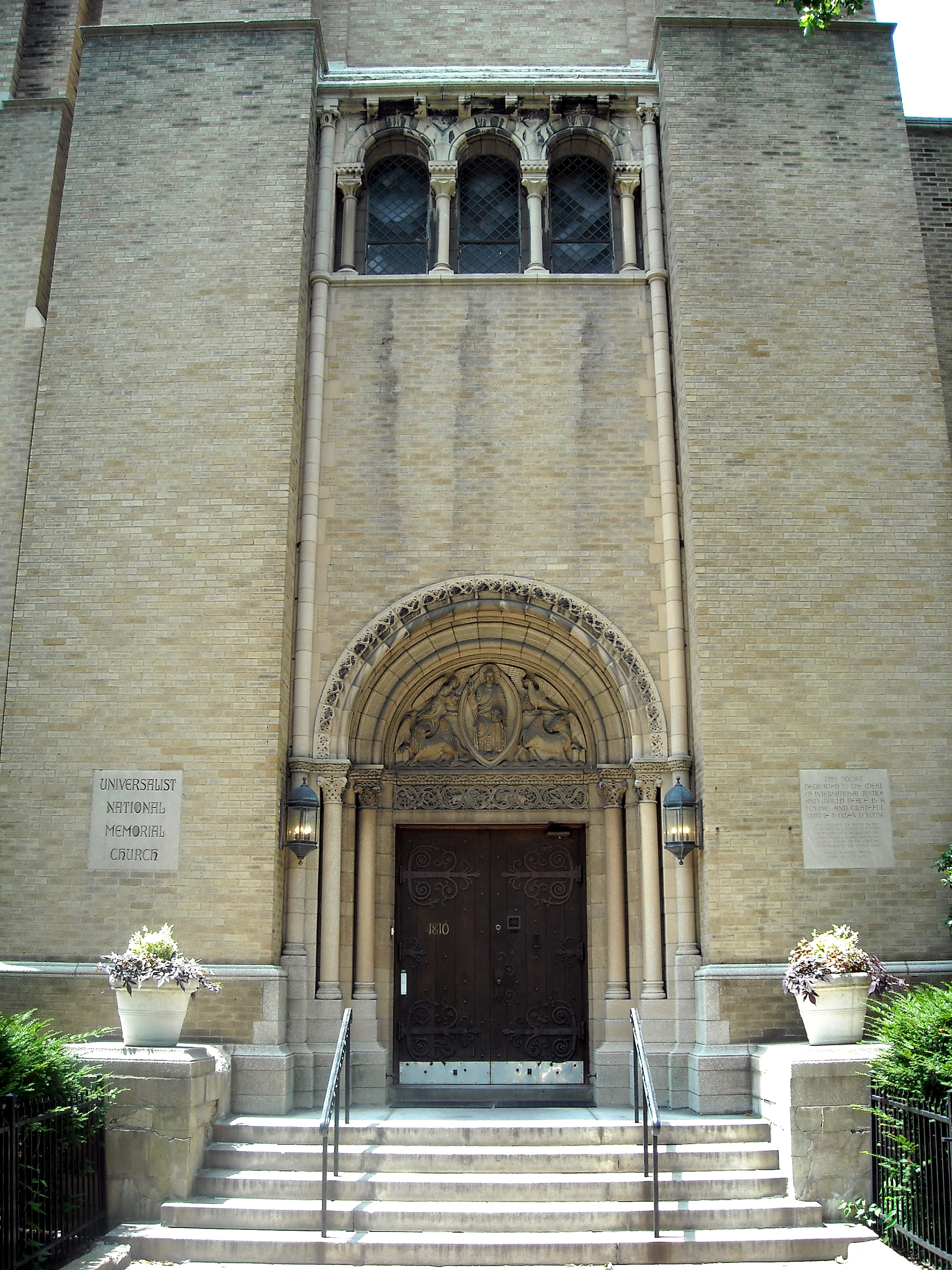
Church door

Universalist ministers visited the Washington area from at least 1827, and in the late 1860s, Universalists began organizing a permanent church. In 1869, The Murray Universalist Society was founded, named in honor of the centenary of John Murray's arrival in North America and the Church of Our Father (First Universalist Church of Washington, D.C.) was founded the following year.

Universalist National Memorial Church was established to serve as the official representative in Washington, D.C., of the Universalist General Convention, later known as the Universalist Church of America. In 1921, the Universalist General Convention approved funding for construction of the church. The first services were held in 1925, although at a different location than the present facility. The first service at Universalist National Memorial Church on 16th Street, NW was held on Palm Sunday 1930, with Frederick Williams Perkins as its first minister.

== Architecture ==
UNMC is an example of Romanesque Revival architecture and was designed by Allen & Collens, architects of the Riverside Church in New York City. The four-story building, a contributing property to the Sixteenth Street Historic District, features a stained-glass window and a stone tower that reaches a height of 98 feet (30 m).

== Affiliations ==
UNMC is a member of the following organizations:

- American Unitarian Conference
- Christian Universalist Association
- Progressive Christianity
- National Association of Congregational Christian Churches
- Unitarian Universalist Association

In 2003, UNMC hosted the Revival conference of the Unitarian Universalist Christian Fellowship.

== Ministers ==
Church of Our Father (First Universalist Church of Washington, D.C.)

- Rev. A. C. Barry: February–May 1870
- Rev. C. H. Day: 1873–1877
- Rev. Alexander Kent: 1877–1890
- Rev. A. A. Whitcomb: 1890–1892
- Rev. A. G. Rogers: 1892–1897
- Rev. Leslie Moore: 1897–1899
- Dr. John van Schaick Jr.: 1900–1918; emeritus: 1923–1949
- Rev. William Couden (acting): 1917–1918
- Dr. Levi M. Powers: 1919–1920
- Dr. John van Schaick Jr.: 1920–1922
- Dr. Clarence Rice: 1922–1926
- Dr. Fredrick W. Perkins: 1927–1930

Universalist National Memorial Church

- Dr. Fredrick W. Perkins: 1930–1939
- Dr. Seth R. Brooks: 1939–1978; emeritus: 1978–1987
- Dr. William L. Fox: 1978-1988
- Rev. James Blair: 1989–1993
- Dr. William L. Fox: 1993–1998; current emeritus
- Rev. Vanessa R. Southern: associate, 1995–1998; sole pastor: 1998–2000
- Rev. Scott Wells: 2000–2004
- Rev. Lillie Mae Henley: 2006–2011
- Crystal Lewis: 2014–2016
- David Gatton: 2014–present
