= Embassy of the Republic of Congo, Washington, D.C. =

Diplomatic mission

Embassy of the Republic of Congo in Washington, D.C.
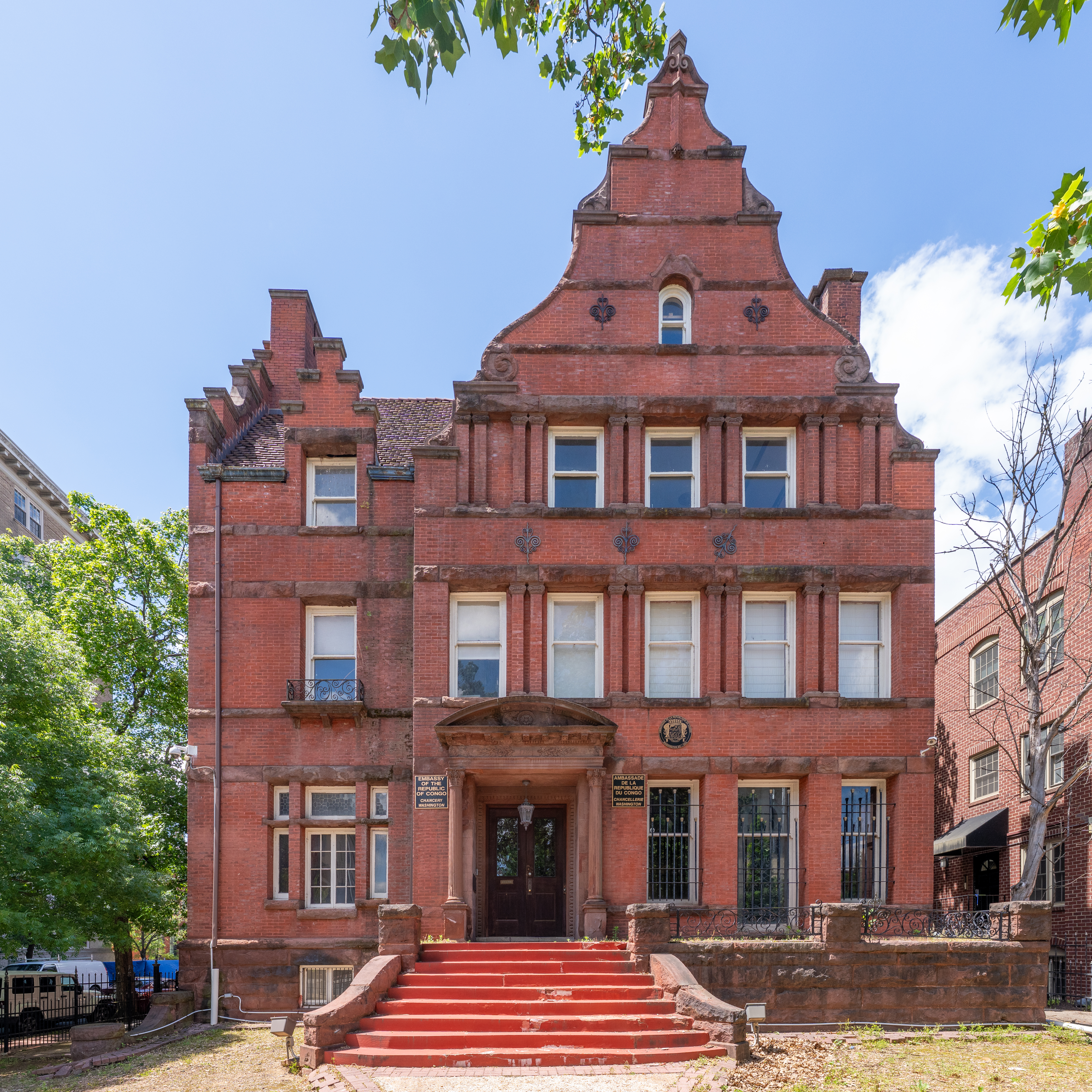
- Location: Washington, DC, United States
- Address: 1720 16th Street NW Washington, DC.
- Coordinates: 38°54′48.7″N 77°2′12.8″W
- Ambassador: Serge Mombouli

The Embassy of the Republic of Congo in Washington, D.C. is the diplomatic mission of the Republic of Congo to the United States. It is housed in the historic Toutorsky Mansion, a former residence located at 1720 16th Street NW in the Dupont Circle neighborhood of Washington, D.C.

The ambassador is Serge Mombouli.

== See also ==
- Republic of the Congo–United States relations
