= Walter Horstmann Thomas =

American architect

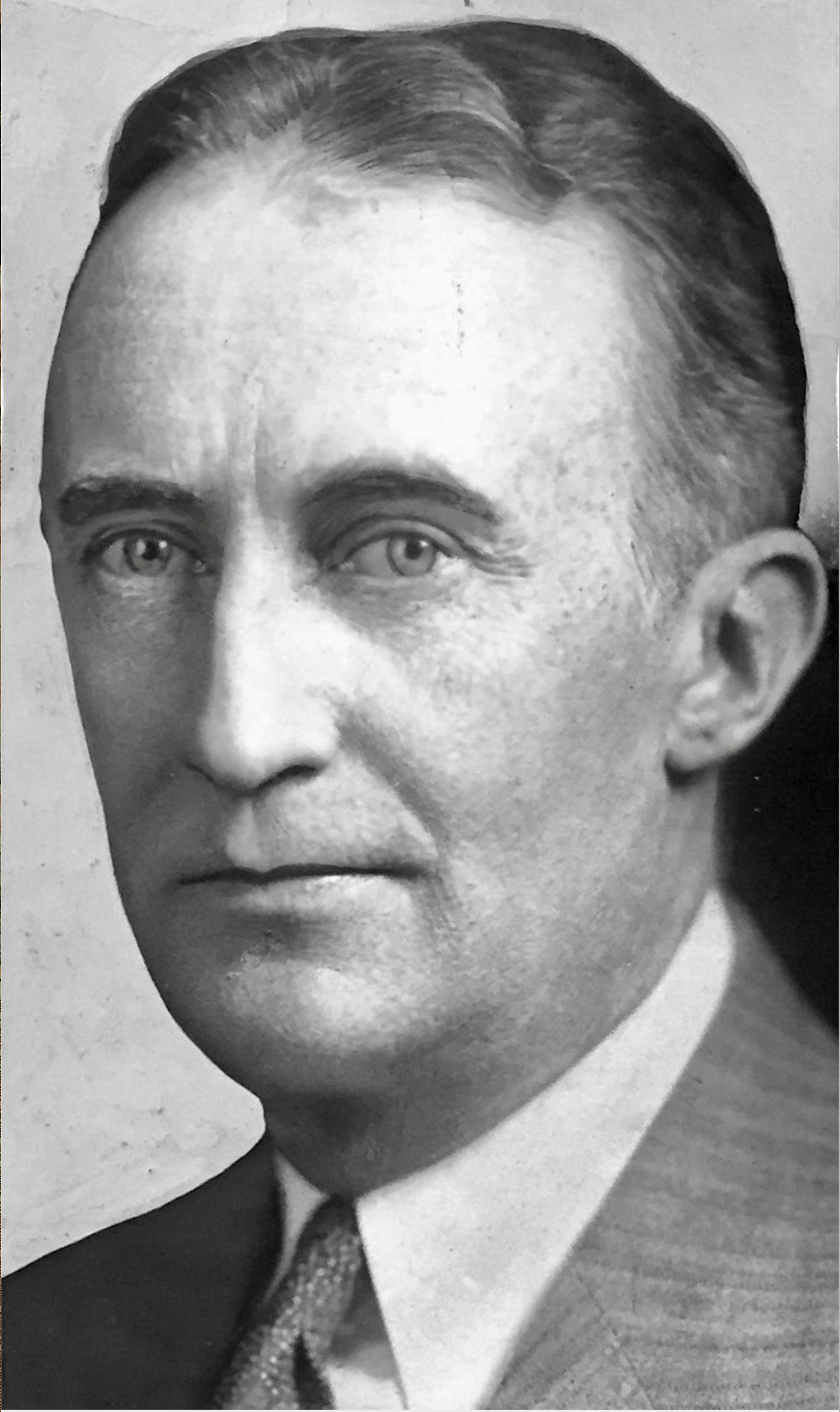
Walter H. Thomas - 1928

Walter Horstmann Thomas (1876–1948) was an American architect from Philadelphia whose career spanned 44 years. He is best known for approximately eighty church designs.

== Early life ==
Thomas was the younger of two children of Richard Newton Thomas, an Episcopal priest who served several Philadelphia parishes, and Clara Horstmann. Thomas was educated in private schools, including the Hamilton School and Episcopal Academy.

== Grand tour ==
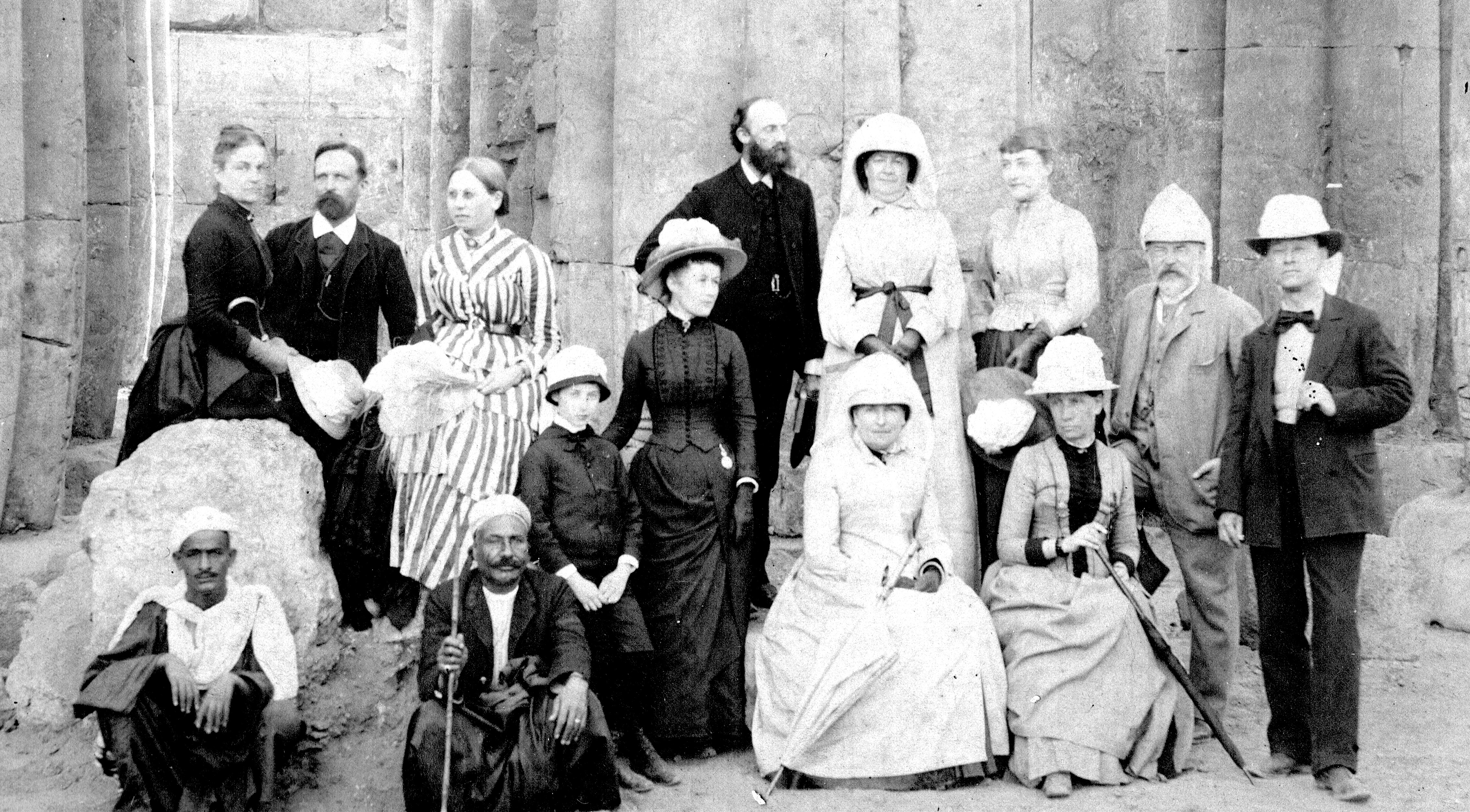
WHT in Luxor - 1889

On December 29, 1888, Thomas’ twelfth birthday, his family sailed from New York for a six-month trip to Europe, Egypt, Palestine, Syria, Greece and Turkey. Thomas kept a diary of this adventure that documents observations of the people and places he saw. In a photo of their party, taken at the Temple of Karnack in Luxor on February 13, 1889, Walter is the youngest in the group. His sister Emma stands to his left and their father, Richard N. Thomas behind her.

== Education ==
Thomas graduated from the University of Pennsylvania in 1899 with a BS in architecture ^{[15]}, then interned in the office of Edgar Seeler ^{[6]} until March 1901 when he and his Penn classmate and Zeta Psi brother Clark Wharton Churchman sailed to Paris. Thomas enrolled in atelier Lambert at the Ecole des Beaux-Arts. He passed the entrance exams in May 1902 ^{[13]}, and also studied planning in ateliers Chaussemiche and Faure-Dujarric. He travelled around Europe visiting architectural sites, recording his impressions in sketches and photographs.

== Early career ==
When Thomas returned to Philadelphia in 1904, he established a partnership with Clark Churchman as Churchman & Thomas. Early clients were fraternity brothers and family members. Thomas’ uncle, George C. Thomas, a partner at Drexel & Co. bankers, was an important client who directly commissioned several projects, mostly church-related.

Thomas joined the American Institute of Architects (AIA) in 1907 ^{[15]} and, by 1912, was attending executive committee meetings of the Philadelphia Chapter as recording secretary. He was also a member of the T-Square Club during this period ^{[1]}.

In 1908, John Molitor joined the firm which then became Thomas, Churchman & Molitor ^{[15]}. TC&M designed a variety of buildings, including trolley stations and a new house for Zeta Psi fraternity on the UPenn Campus.

== World War I ==
As World War I started, the Thomas, Churchman & Molitor partnership dissolved. John Molitor left in 1914 to lead Philadelphia’s new Division of Housing and Sanitation. Thus, some projects designed in 1914 are attributed to Thomas & Churchman. Clark Churchman left in 1915 to work with interior designer E.J. Holmes. Thomas worked on his own during the next three years, much of the time on one of his early landmark buildings, the Chapel of the Mediator P.E. Church, West Philadelphia.

In 1918 Thomas volunteered for the YMCA supporting the American Expeditionary Forces; in August he sailed to Europe and was assigned to manage decoration and maintenance of YMCA huts throughout France.

== Thomas, Martin & Kirkpatrick ==
Thomas returned to Philadelphia in the summer of 1919 and briefly continued his solo practice. In 1920 he formed a new partnership with Sydney E. Martin and Donald M. Kirkpatrick ^{[15]}, both of whom had worked for Thomas, Churchman & Molitor prior to the war.

Thomas became more active with the Philadelphia Chapter of AIA, becoming vice president 1926-1927 and president 1928-1930 ^{[15]}. During his presidency, the AIA formed a design committee and, in coordination with developer Joseph Greenberg, designed and built the Architects Building at 17th and Sansom Streets. Upon its completion this location became the hub of Philadelphia architectural activity for the next two generations. The form designed a number of prominent urban hotels during the 1920s including the Hotel Beach in Bridgeport, Connecticut (1929) and the Hotel Easton (now the Grand Eastonian) in Easton, Pennsylvania (1927).

Thomas designed several large church projects during this period, one of which is a unique, non-sectarian, “ecclesiastical” building, the Girard College Chapel in Philadelphia. TMK won a competition in 1930 and the winning design and resulting building were widely published in the architectural press. ^{[27, 28]} Thomas & Martin continued their partnership after Donald Kirkpatrick left in 1930, although there were few new commissions. Major projects during the 1930s included a science building, library addition, and a dormitory at Bryn Mawr College.

== Bureau of Architecture of the Methodist Episcopal Church ==
Methodist minister Elbert M. Conover established a Philadelphia office of the “Bureau of Architecture of the Methodist Episcopal Church” (BAMEC) in 1919. Conover promoted his concepts of church design through popular, widely distributed books and pamphlets. Conover employed young architecture graduates to provide design review services. In 1924 Conover engaged Walter Thomas as “Consultant” to BAMEC ^{[15]} to provide direction for the young staff and to lead the design of new church projects that were requested by Methodist congregations around the country. As the young architects gained experience, several obtained professional registration. Notable among these were Thoralf Sundt and Bruce Wenner (registered in 1927), ^{[15]} and Hensel Fink and Harold Wagoner (registered in 1933). ^{[15]} Thus, Thomas was the principal designer for BAMEC’s new church projects during this period, while Sundt & Wenner were the architects of record. Conover’s books include many drawings and photos of Thomas’ designs, however many of Conover’s attributions for buildings are technically inaccurate, listing design participants as if they were also architects of record ^{[7], [8], [9]}.

Thomas’ consulting arrangement ended in 1933, when BAMEC’s Philadelphia office closed. Elbert Conover subsequently established the “Interdenominational Bureau of Architecture” (IBA), with an office in New York City. The IBA used a business model in which Conover recommended established architects instead of using in-house design staff.

== City Architect and Philadelphia City Planning Commission ==
In December 1929, Philadelphia Mayor Mackey appointed Walter Thomas to his cabinet as the City Architect. This position had, as recently as 1928, been occupied by Thomas’ former partner John Molitor. Although Thomas’ term as City Architect lasted only for the 1930 calendar year, Thomas continued working for the city for the next six years as Secretary and Technical Director of the Philadelphia City Planning Commission (PCPC).

Thomas initiated and managed PCPC research into numerous planning issues, especially concerns relating to impacts of increasing automobile and truck traffic. Other planning subjects included: location of the city’s airport; updating building and zoning codes; preservation of historic structures; mitigation of slums; providing more efficient municipal services; providing more recreation facilities; more schools; further planning for public districts within the city, especially the Parkway area, the University of Pennsylvania and Civic Center, the new Pennsylvania Railroad station and Post Office at 30th Street and the banks of the Schuylkill River; and coordination of multi-modal transportation systems. ^{[12]}

As the depression intensified in the mid-1930s and, after the Roosevelt administration developed its various agencies and boards, the PCPC used some of the federal funding thus made available to further the planning projects cited above.

== Public housing ==
By the spring of 1937, as federal funding started to become available for public housing, Thomas accepted the position of Technical Director to the newly-formed Philadelphia Housing Authority. His responsibilities included supervising all of the planning, architecture and engineering for programs involving four housing projects, totaling roughly 3,000 dwelling units. This work continued until 1942 when war expenditures severely limited federal spending for domestic programs.

== World War II ==
The Thomas & Martin partnership ended in 1940. Sydney Martin maintained the current clients, including Bryn Mawr College, and formed his own firm. Around 1940 Thomas was one of the founding members of the Church Architecture Guild of America. He was elected president of this group in 1945. Thomas also taught two courses in City Planning at the University of Pennsylvania from 1941 to 1944.^{[16]}

== Thomas & Wagoner, Thomas & Antrim ==
In the early 1940s, Thomas received requests to design churches, many referred by his long-time friend Elbert Conover. Thomas reconnected with Harold Wagoner in 1944, who had been one of the staff architects under his direction at BAMEC from 1926-1933 and who had worked for T&M from 1936-1939. In 1944, Wagoner had just been discharged from the Army after designing building camouflage during the war. The new firm, titled “Walter H. Thomas, Architect and Harold E. Wagoner, Associated Architect,” was established to pursue ecclesiastical work.

Thomas formed a similar partnership around the same time with Walter Antrim to pursue municipal projects. Antrim had worked for TMK from 1922-1929 and in various positions under Thomas at the PCPC and the Housing Authority in the 1930s. Thomas & Antrim’s main project was a vocational school for the Philadelphia School Board.

The Thomas & Wagoner partnership's project list grew quickly. In June 1947, Thomas & Wagoner's list of current church projects to show prospective clients included twenty-three projects in fifteen states then proceeding in various stages of design. By the time of Thomas’ death, a year later, Richmond, VA, First Presbyterian Church stated in its fundraising brochure that “Thomas & Wagoner had thirty church projects underway in sixteen states.” ^{[26]} Thomas did not see most of these completed however, due to the economic impact of World War II which had seriously disrupted availability of materials, labor and capital for non-war-related work. Harold Wagoner eventually completed those projects, the construction of several of which lasted through the 1950s.

== Personal life ==
In October 1906, Walter married Natalie Taylor, daughter of Nathan A. Taylor and Florence N. Supplee. They had two daughters, Claire (Ravaçon) (1907-1997) and Florence (Davis) (1909-1999). Natalie died in March 1913. Thomas married Ruth Boomer in December 1919. They had one son, Brooks Thomas (1931-2010). Thomas was member of St. Paul's Episcopal church in Overbrook, Philadelphia and served on its vestry. He was the secretary for the P.E. Church City Mission for many years. He was a Mason and belonged to several Philadelphia area clubs.

== Selected architectural works ==
Documented examples of the work of Walter H. Thomas and his various partnerships are listed below. Dates indicate the approximate completion of design. Names of projects are those used at the time of design.

=== Churchman & Thomas ===
- 1905 Parish House, St. Simon the Cyrenian P.E. Church, Philadelphia, PA – Extant ^{[1]}
- 1906 Jay Cooke Memorial Chapel, St. Paul's Episcopal Church (Elkins Park, Pennsylvania) – Extant ^{[1], [17]}
- 1906 St Paul's Memorial P.E. Church, Philadelphia, PA – Demolished ^{[1]}
- 1906 William Kent Residence, Wyncote, PA – Extant ^{[1], [17]}
- 1906 J. Duncan Whelen Residence, Overbrook, PA – Extant ^{[1]}
- 1907 Parish House, P.E. Chapel of the Mediator, Philadelphia, PA – Extant ^{[1], [17]}

=== Thomas, Churchman & Molitor ===
- 1908 Speculative Residences for Wendell & Smith, Overbrook, PA – Extant ^{[3]}
- 1908 Remington Residence, Chestnut Hill, PA – Extant ^{[1], [3], [17]}
- 1908 Risdale Residence, Cynwyd, PA – Extant ^{[3], [17]}
- 1909 Zeta Psi Fraternity House, U of PA, Philadelphia, PA – Extant ^{[1], [3], [5]}
- 1909 Morgan Residence, Chestnut Hill, PA – Demolished ^{[1], [3], [17]}
- 1909 Gilbert Residence, Rydal, PA – Demolished ^{[1], [3], [17]}
- 1909 Wanamaker Residence, Merion, PA – Demolished ^{[1], [3], [17]}
- 1912 Logan Residence, Chestnut Hill, PA – Extant ^{[3]}
- 1912 All Souls P.E. Church for the Deaf, Philadelphia, PA – Extant ^{[1]}
- 1912 Adath Jeshurun Synagogue, Philadelphia, PA – Demolished ^{[1]}
- 1913 St. Simon the Cyrenian P.E. Church Sanctuary, Philadelphia, PA – Extant ^{[17]}

=== Walter H. Thomas ===
- 1916 Chapel of the Mediator P.E. Church, Philadelphia, PA – Extant ^{[1], [4], [17]}
- 1916 Taylor Residence, Chestnut Hill, PA – Extant ^{[1], [3]}
- 1916 St. George’s P.E. Church, Richmond, Philadelphia, PA – Demolished ^{[1]}

=== Thomas, Martin & Kirkpatrick ===
- 1921 Knapp Residence, Easton, PA – Extant ^{[23]}
- 1921 YMCA, Easton, PA – Extant ^{[1]}
- 1922 Ardmore Presbyterian Church, Ardmore, PA – Extant ^{[17]}
- 1923 Altamont Hotel, Hazleton, PA – Extant ^{[1], [3]}
- 1924 Leverington Presbyterian Church, Philadelphia, PA – Extant ^{[3], [7]}
- 1924 Easton Hotel, Easton, PA – Extant ^{[3], [17]}
- 1924 U of Pennsylvania Power Plant, Philadelphia, PA – Extant ^{[1], [3], [5]}
- 1924 St. Mark’s P.E. Church, Casper, WY – Extant ^{[1]}
- 1925 Viking Hotel, Newport, RI – Extant ^{[18]}
- 1925 YMCA, York, PA – Extant ^{[3]}
- 1926 Cathedral School for Boys, Laramie, WY – Extant ^{[1]}
- 1926 Hospital for Crippled Children, Elizabethtown, PA – Extant ^{[15]}
- 1926 Brigantine Beach Hotel, Brigantine Beach, NJ – Extant ^{[1], [3]}
- 1927 Christian Association, Philadelphia, PA – Extant ^{[1], [3], [5]}
- 1927 YMCA, Germantown, PA – Extant ^{[1]}
- 1928 Immanuel Lutheran Church, Philadelphia, PA – Extant ^{[3]}
- 1928 Christ Lutheran Church, Hazleton, PA – Extant ^{[1], [3], [17]}
- 1929 Architects Building, Philadelphia, PA – Extant ^{[24]}
- 1929 Biltmore Hotel, Oklahoma City, OK – Demolished ^{[1]}
- 1929 Ingersoll Residence, Fort Washington, PA – Altered ^{[3], [17]}
- 1929 Ebenezer Lutheran Church, Columbia, SC – Extant ^{[20], [26]}

=== Bureau of Architecture of the Methodist Episcopal Church ===
- 1927 Trainer Methodist Church, Trainer, PA – Extant ^{[21]}
- 1928 Central Methodist Church, Muskegon, MI – Extant ^{[8], [9]}
- 1928 Calvary Methodist Church, Frederick, MD – Extant ^{[8], [9], [26]}
- 1929 First Methodist Church, Tucson, AZ – Extant ^{[8]}
- 1930 First Methodist Church Chapel, Germantown, Philadelphia, PA – Extant ^{[9], [26]}
- 1931 Metropolitan Methodist Church, Washington, DC – Extant ^{[4], [26]}
- 1932 Trinity Methodist Church, Albany, NY – Extant ^{[8], [9]}

=== Philadelphia City Architect ===
- 1930 Robin Hood Dell, Philadelphia, PA – Altered ^{[25]}

=== Thomas & Martin ===
- 1931 Girard College Chapel, Philadelphia, PA – Extant ^{[1], [4], [17], [26], [27], [28]}
- 1931 Lutheran Church of the Advocate, Philadelphia, PA – Extant ^{[22]}
- 1937 Rhoades Hall, Bryn Mawr College, Bryn Mawr, PA – Extant ^{[17]}
- 1937 Park Science Building, Bryn Mawr College, Bryn Mawr, PA – Altered ^{[17], [26]}
- 1937 St. Christopher’s Hospital for Children, Philadelphia, PA – Extant ^{[17]}
- 1939 Quinta Woodward Library Wing, Bryn Mawr College, Bryn Mawr, PA – Extant ^{[17], [26]}

=== Philadelphia Housing Authority ===
- 1937 Hill Creek Housing - Walter Thomas, Chief Architect; Other Architects included Walter Antrim, Clarence DeArmond, Donald Folsom, Edmund Gilchrist, Robert Rhodes McGoodwin, Harold Saunders, Philadelphia, PA – Extant ^{[19], [29]}
- 1939 Glenwood Housing - Walter Thomas, Director; W. Pope Barney, Chief Architect. Associated Architects included Roy W. Branwell, Edmund Gilchrist, Harry E. Parker, William H. Thompson, Frank R. Watson, Philadelphia, PA – Extant ^{[19]}
- 1940 Poplar Housing - Walter Thomas, Technical Director; Associated Architects included George I. Lovatt, Director, John P.B. Sinkler, Paul P. Cret, Roy T. Larson, John H. Rankin, Donald Folsom, Philadelphia, PA – Demolished ^{[19]}

=== Thomas & Wagoner (All Projects ca. 1944-1948) ===
- Immanuel Evangelical Lutheran Church, Baltimore, MD – Extant ^{[8]}
- Second Presbyterian Church, Memphis, TN – Extant ^{[26]}
- Highland Presbyterian Church, Fayetteville, NC – Extant ^{[9]}
- Morningside Presbyterian Church, Atlanta, GA – Extant ^{[8], [26]}
- Davidson College Presbyterian Church, Davidson, NC – Extant ^{[26]}
- First Congregational Church, Mansfield, OH – Extant ^{[10], [26]}
- Grace Methodist Church, Wilmington, NC – Extant ^{[9], [26]}
- Central Methodist Church, Muskegon, MI - Extant ^{[10]}
- First Presbyterian Church, Richmond, VA – Extant ^{[26]}
- First Baptist Church, Washington, DC – Extant ^{[8], [26]}
- First Presbyterian Church, Jackson, MS – Extant ^{[9]}
- First Baptist Church, Florence, SC – Extant ^{[26]}
- Reid Presbyterian Church, Augusta, GA – Extant ^{[26]}
- Rand Chapel, Central Presbyterian Church, Atlanta, GA – Extant ^{[26]}
- Westwood Community Methodist Church, Los Angeles, CA – Extant ^{[9], [10]}

== Gallery ==
1906 St. Paul's P.E. Church, Philadelphia, PA	1907 Parish House, P.E. Chapel of the Mediator, Philadelphia, PA	1909 Zeta Psi House, U of PA, Philadelphia, PA	1916 Chapel of the Mediator P.E. Church, Philadelphia, PA
1916 Taylor Residence, Chestnut Hill, PA	1922 Ardmore Presbyterian Church, Ardmore, PA	1924 U of PA Power Plant, Philadelphia, PA	1925 Viking Hotel, Newport, RI
1926 Hospital for Crippled Children, Elizabethtown, PA	1926 Brigantine Beach Hotel, Brigantine Beach, NJ	1927 Christian Association, Philadelphia, PA	1927 YMCA, Germantown, PA
1928 Immanuel Lutheran Church, Philadelphia, PA	1928 Christ Lutheran Church, Hazleton, PA	1928 Calvary Methodist Church, Frederick, MD	1929 Biltmore Hotel, Oklahoma City, OK
1929 Architects Building, Philadelphia, PA	1931 Girard College Chapel, Philadelphia, PA	1931 Metropolitan Methodist Church, Washington, DC	1932 Trinity Methodist Church, Albany, NY
1937 Rhoades Hall, Bryn Mawr College, Bryn Mawr, PA	1937 Hill Creek Housing, Philadelphia, PA	ca. 1944 Immanuel Evangelical Lutheran Church, Baltimore, MD	1948 Morningside Presbyterian Church, Atlanta, GA
ca.1948 Reid Presbyterian Church, Augusta, GA	ca. 1948 First Baptist Church, Washington, DC	ca.1948 Westwood Community Methodist Church, Los Angeles, CA	1948 First Presbyterian Church, Richmond, VA
