= Trinity Presbyterian Church (Montgomery, Alabama) =

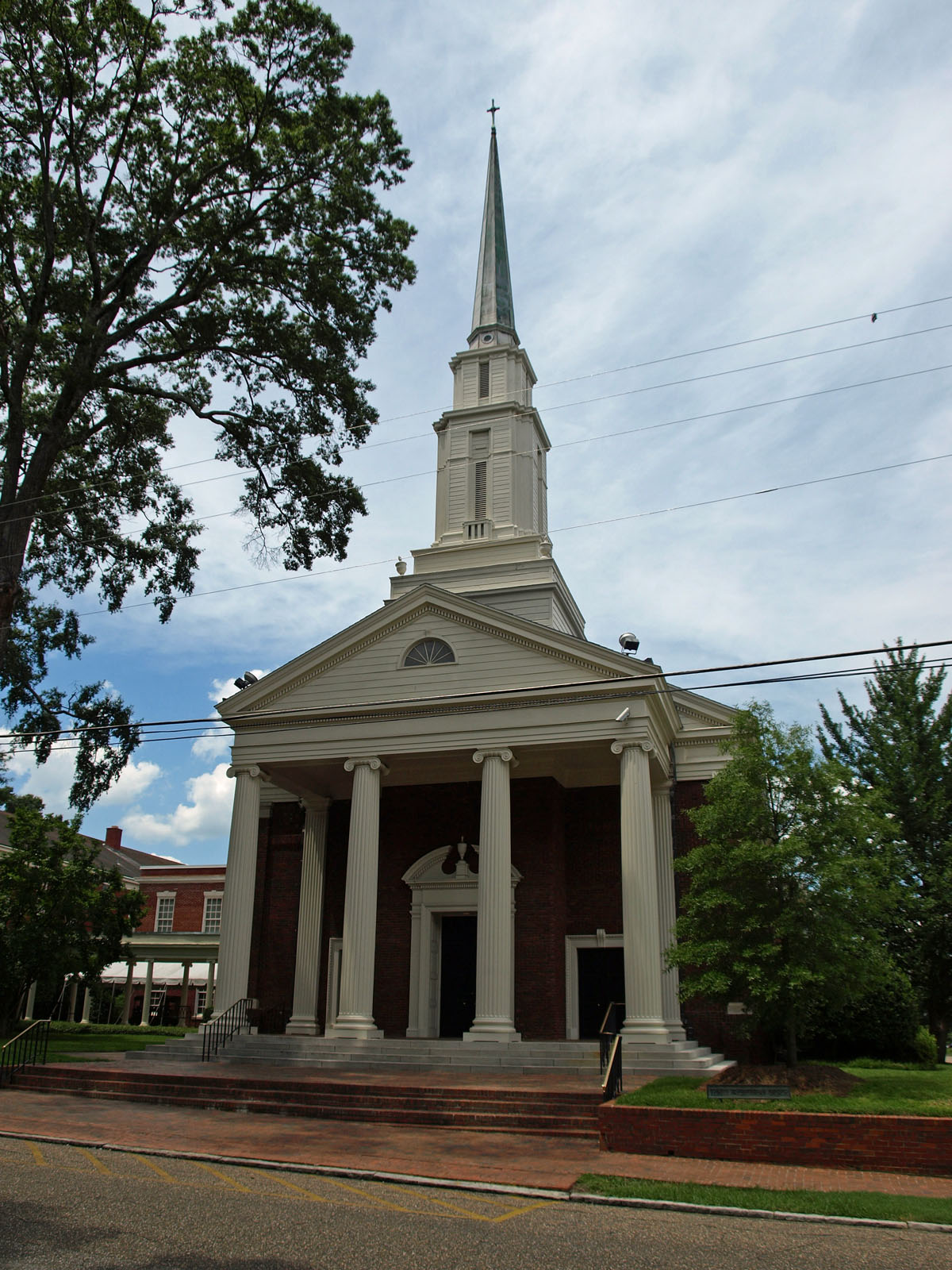
- Trinity Presbyterian Church
- 32°21′26.6″N 86°18′11.3″W
- Location: 1728 S Hull St, Montgomery, Alabama
- Country: United States
- Denomination: Presbyterian Church in America
- Previous denomination: Presbyterian Church in the United States
- Churchmanship: Evangelical, Reformed
- Website: trinitypca.org

History
- Former name: Central Presbyterian Church
- Founded: July, 1891

Architecture
- Architect: Harold E. Wagoner
- Architectural type: Georgian revival
- Years built: 1952

Trinity Presbyterian Church in Montgomery, Alabama is a flagship and founding congregation within the Presbyterian Church in America, PCA. Trinity has about 1,300 members.

== History ==
It was founded by members of the First Presbyterian Church in Montgomery, Alabama in July 1891 as Central Presbyterian Church in downtown Montgomery. The congregation grew rapidly from 32 members to over 400. In 1893 the church building was completed at Lawrence and Washington Streets. In 1909 the church moved to the Garden District of Montgomery and adopted its current name, Trinity Presbyterian Church. The new sanctuary building was completed in 1913 on the corner of Hull Street and Felder Avenue.

In 1951 the sanctuary was burned. Two firemen were killed during the blaze. Original walls remained however. The congregation rebuilt it soon after the fire, using the Georgian style of architecture. It was designed by the famous architect Harold E. Wagoner, and was completed in 1952. The Chancel reflects the return to the classical design of the European architecture. The pulpit has wood carvings of ancient Christian symbols. The cassavant organ was installed in 1985. In 1970 the Trinity Presbyterian School was formed.

During the 1950s and 1960s, the church was the largest Southern Presbyterian congregation in Alabama and played a significant role in opposing desegregation and the Civil Rights Movement. In 1965 the church refused to admit a mixed-race group to hear a sermon by Leighton Ford, a Billy Graham associate. In 1973 Trinity Presbyterian left the Presbyterian Church in the United States over its growing theological liberalism and became a charter member of the Presbyterian Church in America. The congregation is a member of the Southeast Alabama Presbytery of the PCA.

== Doctrine ==
It adheres to the Westminster Confession of Faith, the Westminster Larger Catechism and Westminster Shorter Catechism, as well as the Apostles Creed and Nicene Creed. Trinity describes itself as Protestant, Reformed, evangelistic, Presbyterian, grace-oriented, kingdom-minded and confessional. The church affirms the existence of the triune God, the deity of Jesus Christ, the bodily resurrection of Jesus, and total biblical inerrancy.

The current Senior Minister is Kurt Cooper.

== Missions ==
The church is involved in several missions in Alabama, Idaho, Georgia, Kentucky, Tennessee, Mexico, Costa Rica, Peru, Colombia, Chile, Kenya, Uganda, England, Spain, Belgium, Ukraine, France, Athens (Greece), Budapest, Hungary, Germany, Asia, Taiwan, Australia and around the world.
