= Harold E. Wagoner =

American ecclesiastical architect

Harold Eugene Wagoner
- Wagoner in 1959 showing his plan for Westminster Presbyterian Church of Greenville, South Carolina
- Born: February 27, 1905; Pittsburgh, Pennsylvania
- Died: April 23, 1986 (aged 81)
- Education: Carnegie Institute of Technology
- Occupation: Architect
- Awards: Award of Merit, Carnegie Institute of Technology; Church Architecture Guild of America
- Practice: Thomas & Wagoner 1944–1948 Harold E. Wagoner and Associates 1949–1980
- Buildings: United States Air Force Academy Cadet Chapel interior, Coral Ridge Presbyterian Church, National Presbyterian Church, Cathedral of the Rockies

Harold Eugene Wagoner (February 27, 1905 – April 23, 1986) was a prominent twentieth-century American ecclesiastical architect who designed many notable churches, including Coral Ridge Presbyterian and The National Presbyterian Church, as well as helping design the interior of the United States Air Force Academy Cadet Chapel. His firm was entirely devoted to ecclesiastical work and had more than 500 commissions in 36 states. He was an instructor in architecture at the Drexel Institute of Technology for more than twenty years.

== Biography ==
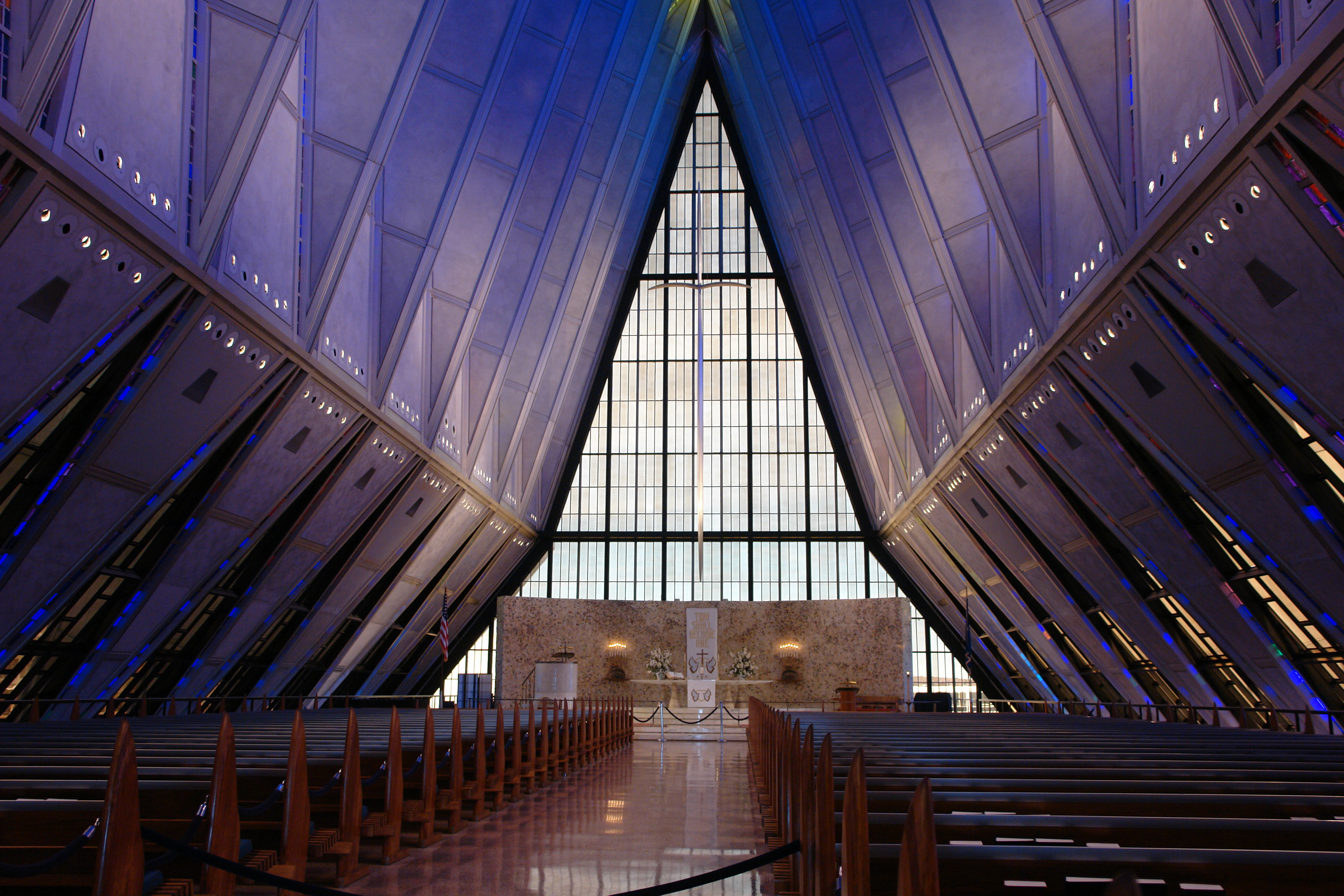
The Protestant chapel at the Air Force Academy, for which Wagoner designed the furnishings

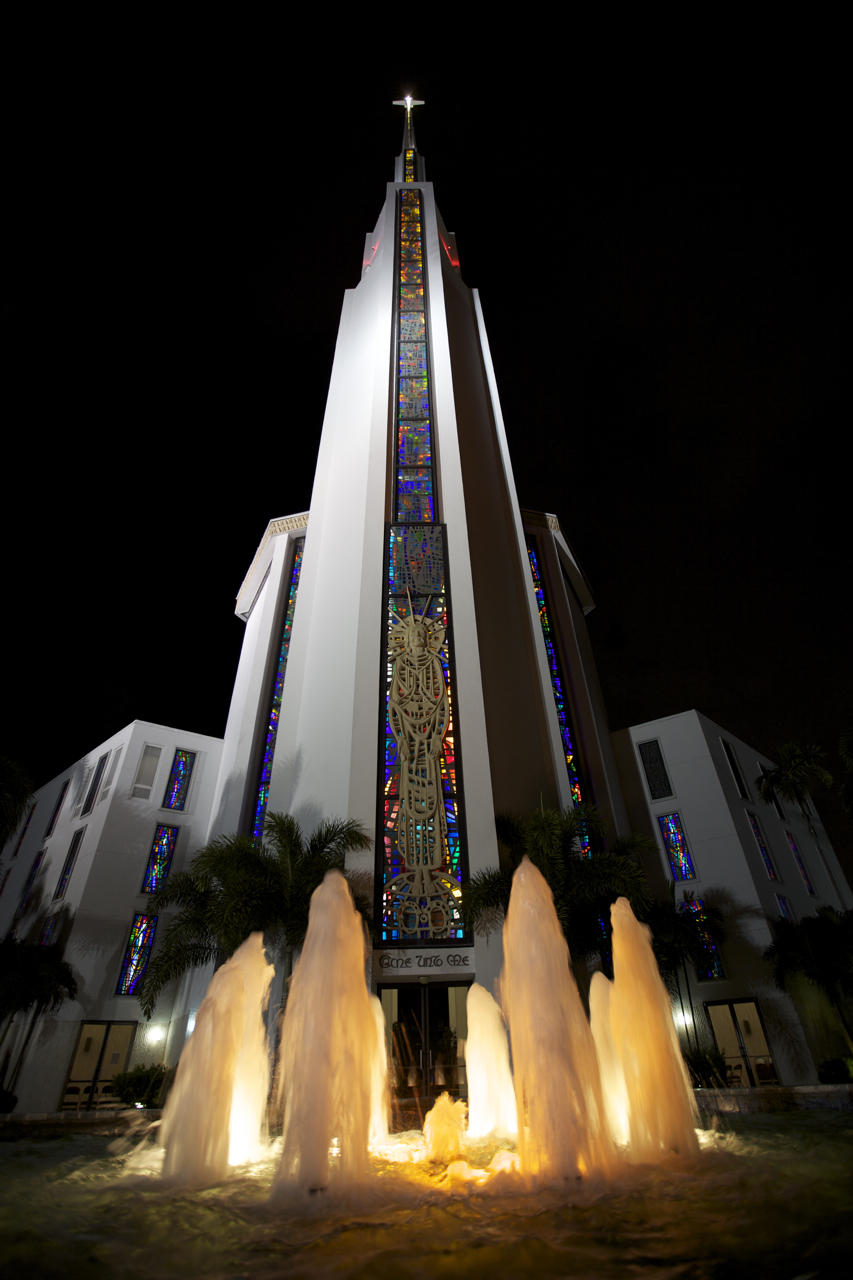
Coral Ridge Presbyterian Church, founded by evangelist D. James Kennedy

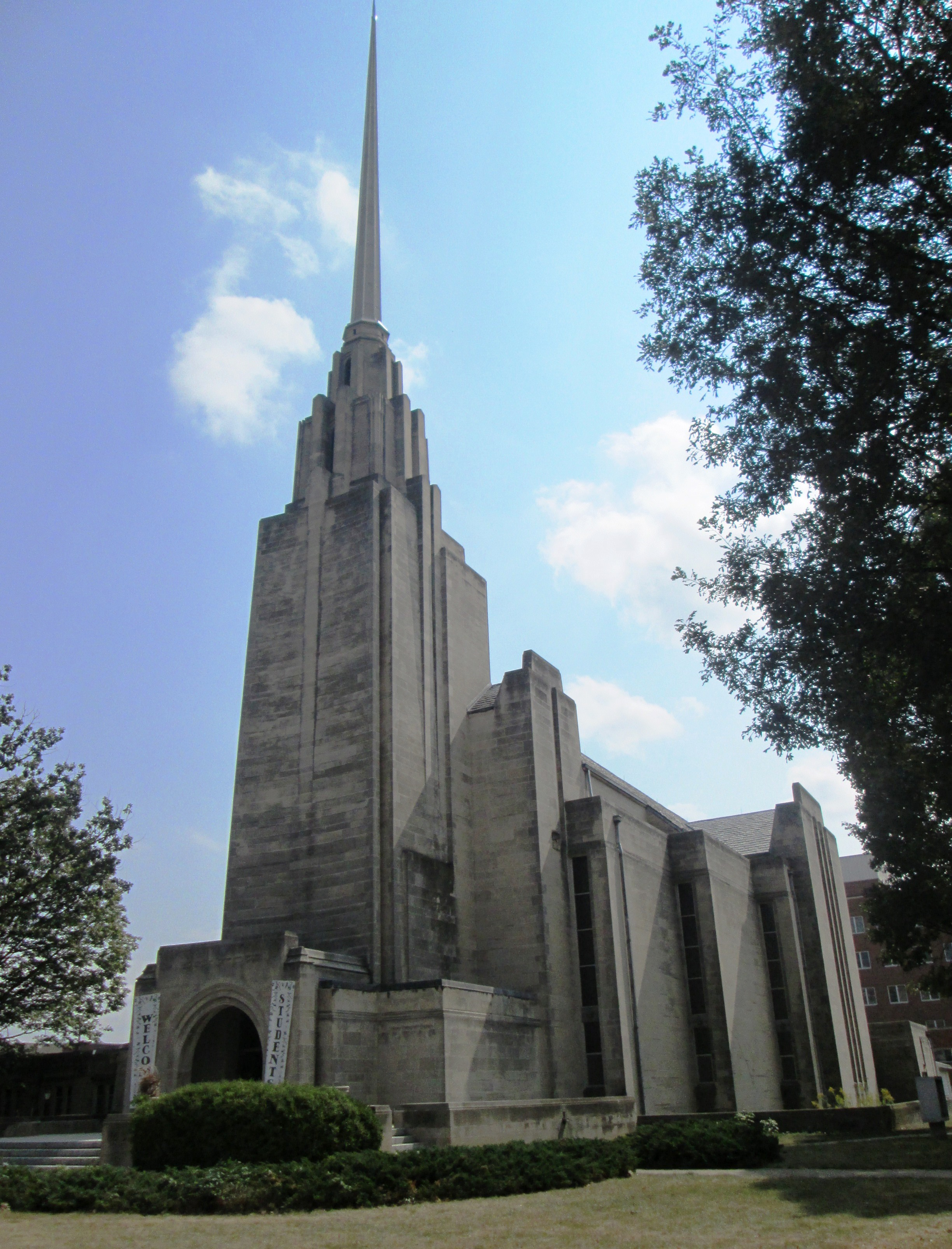
Wesley United Methodist Church in Urbana, Illinois

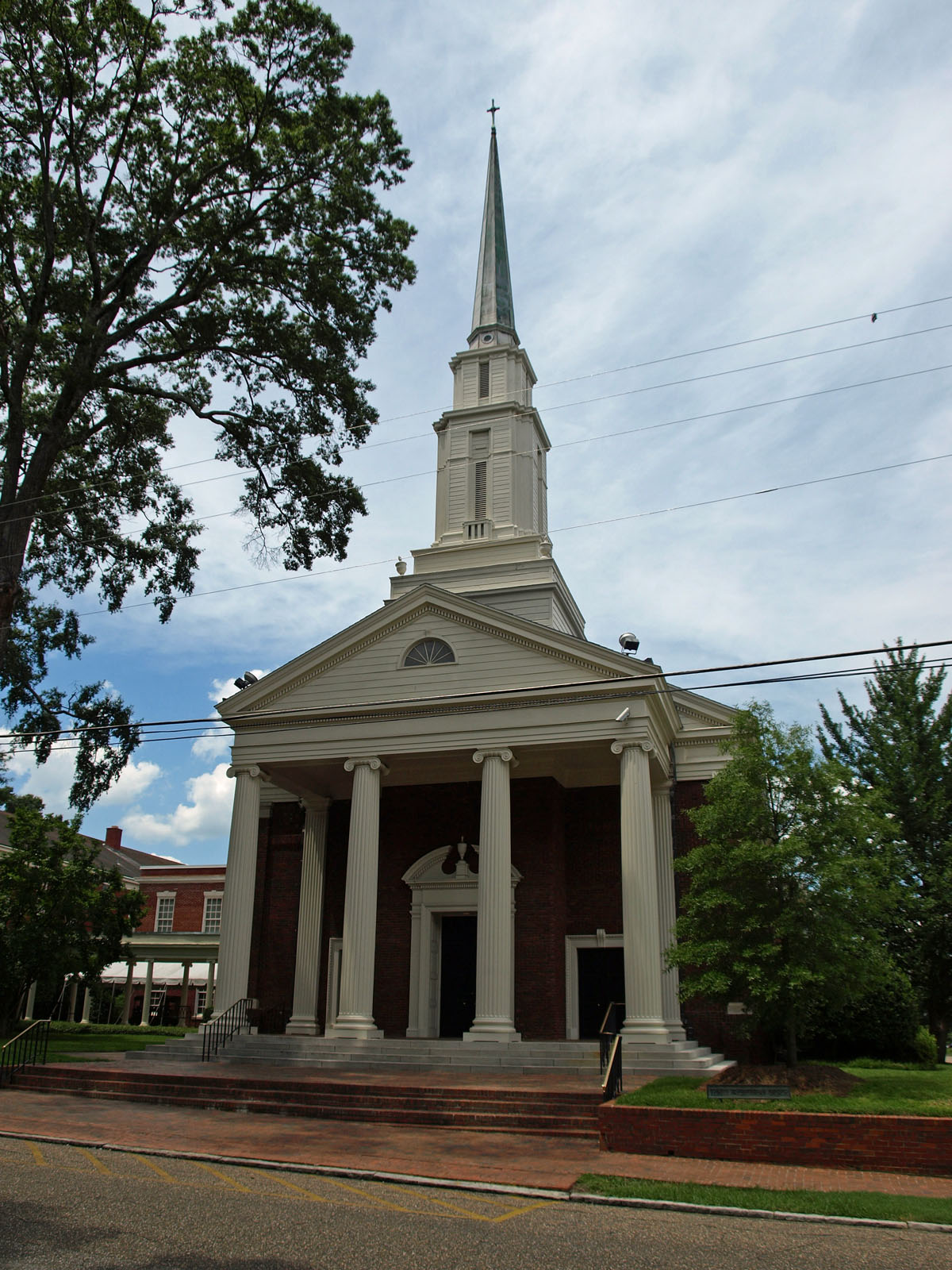
Trinity Presbyterian Church, Montgomery, Alabama

Wagoner was born in Pittsburgh, Pennsylvania to Harriet and Jesse Wagoner and earned a degree in architecture from the Carnegie Institute of Technology, now Carnegie Mellon University. Immediately after graduation in 1926 he went to work for the Methodist Bureau of Architecture in Philadelphia where he would continue until its demise in 1933, during the Great Depression. In that year he went to Fontainebleau to study at the École Americaine des Beaux-Arts. After his time in France he moved back to Philadelphia where he was associated with the firm of Thomas & Martin followed by Wenner & Chance. From 1942 to 1944, during World War II, he served as Chief of the Camouflage Unit, U.S. Army Engineers.

In 1944 he was invited by Walter H. Thomas to form the firm Thomas & Wagoner. At the time of Thomas's death in 1948, the firm had approximately 30 church-related projects underway in 16 states. After Thomas's death, Wagoner formed Wagoner and Associates, which continued into the 1980s. In 1948, he was given the Award of Merit by his alma mater, the Carnegie Institute, and during the 1950s and 60s he dominated the awards of the Church Architecture Guild of America. Wagoner was vice-president of the Philadelphia Chapter of the AIA and also served as chairman of the Commission on Architecture, Lutheran Society of Music, Worship and the Arts and President of the Church Architectural Guild of America. He was succeeded in his firm by Henry Jung.

== Style ==
Wagoner, a Presbyterian, was among the most notable architects of Protestant churches in mid-twentieth century America, with a reputation and impact that few could match. He first received accolades for his designs for First Presbyterian of Vero Beach and St. Paul's Evangelical Lutheran in Savannah, with the later being called, "one of the truly great churches of the South." Some of his commissions were more modest, such as First Baptist in Levittown, but his work was primarily on the high-end for wealthier congregations.

In contrast to Frank Lloyd Wright, the most prominent architect of the time, Wagoner was quite attuned to client wishes. Where Wright would create "client proof" buildings intended to fulfill his own original vision rather than any desire of the customer, Wagoner's hallmark was adapting to congregational needs and desires. If the congregation wished a Colonial Revival church, as with Trinity Presbyterian in Montgomery, then that is what he delivered. If they wished something modern, such as at Wesley United Methodist in Urbana, then he would create a modern design. His work is thus quite eclectic, ranging from the Indiana Limestone-clad First Presbyterian in South Bend, to the very modern glass and concrete Second Presbyterian, and towering Coral Ridge Presbyterian, in Fort Lauderdale. The Thomas & Wagoner design for Community Methodist Church in Westwood, Los Angeles used so much concrete that Civil Defense authorities declared it the most Atom bomb proof building in the city.

Wagoner himself worried privately to his friends that he was merely a competent architect rather than a great one. Vincent Kling said of Wagoner that:

No two buildings are alike which, in my opinion, is a great asset. He has always been able to select the architectural mood which is most suited to the environment of the community in which he works. When the site and the sponsorship suggested a very dramatic building, Mr. Wagoner has risen to the occasion and produced good architecture. On the other hand, when the established community and its sponsorship suggested a modest building in character with the neighborhood, Mr. Wagoner again was sensitive to the situation and produced good architecture.

== Select works ==
Note: Projects initiated during the Thomas & Wagoner period (1944-1948) were designed by Walter H. Thomas and their construction was completed by Wagoner. In a 1956 list of "Ecclesiastical Work", Wagoner states that "Certain of the foregoing projects were undertaken with local architects, or were executed under the firm name of Thomas and Wagoner." Projects executed under the firm name of Thomas and Wagoner are marked with an * in the list below.

- Immanuel Lutheran Church Baltimore, Maryland (1946), *
- Rand Chapel of Central Presbyterian Church, Atlanta, Georgia, Early English Gothic Revival style (1949) *
- Grace United Methodist Church, Wilmington, NC (1950) *
- Bridgeport United Methodist Church, Bridgeport, WV (1950-1951)
- Community Methodist Church, Westwood, Los Angeles, First Award for Large Churches, Church Architectural Guild of America (1951) *
- Second Presbyterian Church, Memphis, Tennessee, Second Award for Large Churches, Church Architectural Guild of America (1952) *
- Lutheran Church of the Redeemer, Atlanta, Georgia, blending of the Gothic and Modern architecture (1952)
- First Presbyterian Church, South Bend, Indiana, First Award for Large Churches, Church Architectural Guild of America (1952) *
- Trinity Presbyterian Church, Montgomery, Alabama (1952) *
- Davidson College Presbyterian Church, Davidson College, Davidson, NC (1952) *
- First Presbyterian Church, Burlington, North Carolina, Honorable Mention for Large Churches, Church Architectural Guild of America (1953) *
- Margate Community Church, Margate, New Jersey, Honorable Mention for Small Churches, Church Architectural Guild of America (1955)
- First Baptist Church, Washington D.C. (1955) *
- First Presbyterian Church, Royal Oak, Michigan (1955)
- Reid Memorial Presbyterian Church, Augusta, Georgia (1955) *
- St. Paul's Evangelical Lutheran Church, Savannah, Georgia, Award, Guild for Religious Architecture (1957)
- Saint Mark Lutheran Church, Salem, Oregon (1957)
- Belmont Avenue Baptist Church, Marple Township, Pennsylvania, Third Award for design, Church Architectural Department of the Baptist Sunday School Board (1957)
- First Presbyterian Church, Vero Beach, Florida, First Award, Small Church, Guild for Religious Architecture (1958)
- Haddonfield United Methodist Church, Haddonfield, New Jersey (1958)
- Wesley United Methodist in Urbana, Illinois, Expressionistic version of Late Gothic Revival style (1959)
- Second Presbyterian Church, Fort Lauderdale, Florida (1959)
- Westminster Presbyterian Church, Greenville, South Carolina (1959)
- St. Mark's Lutheran Church, Charlotte, NC (1960)
- Cathedral of the Rockies, Boise, Idaho (1960)
- Highland Presbyterian Church, Fayetteville, NC (1960) *
- First Presbyterian Church, Elkhart, Indiana, Special Mention Award, Indiana Society of Architects (1961)
- First Presbyterian Church, Parkersburg, West Virginia (1961)
- Wesley Memorial United Methodist Church, High Point, NC (1961, sanctuary 1968)
- Interior design of Chapel and Church Center at the United Nations, New York, New York (1962)
- First Presbyterian Church, Gastonia, NC (1962)
- Covenant Presbyterian Church, Staunton, VA (1962)
- University Presbyterian Church, Chapel Hill, NC (1962)
- Grace Lutheran Church, State College, PA, Award, Guild for Religious Architecture (1964)
- Grace United Methodist Church, Wyckoff, New Jersey (1964)
- Haymount United Methodist Church, Fayetteville, NC (1964) *
- First Presbyterian Church, Avenel, New Jersey, Honor Award, Pennsylvania Society of Architects (1965)
- Valley Presbyterian Church - Education Building, Scottsdale, Arizona, Award of Merit, Guild for Religious Architecture
- National Presbyterian Church, Washington D.C. (1967)
- First Baptist Church, Martinsville, VA (1967)
- Mount Vernon Presbyterian Church, Atlanta, GA (1967)
- Christ United Methodist Church, Greensboro, NC (1968)
- First Presbyterian Church, Kinston, NC (1968)
- First Baptist Church, Chattanooga, Tennessee, Third Award for Design, Church Architectural Department of the Baptist Sunday School Board (1968)
- Shrine of the Ages at the Grand Canyon (1970)
- Coral Ridge Presbyterian Church, Fort Lauderdale, Florida (1973)

Sources:

- American Architects Directory (PDF) (First ed.). R.R. Bowker. 1956. p. 581. Archived from the original (PDF) on 2015-05-27.
- American Architects Directory (PDF) (Second ed.). R.R. Bowker. 1962. p. 733. Archived from the original (PDF) on 2014-12-10.
- American Architects Directory (PDF) (Third ed.). R.R. Bowker. 1970. p. 956. Archived from the original (PDF) on 2015-05-27.

== Gallery ==
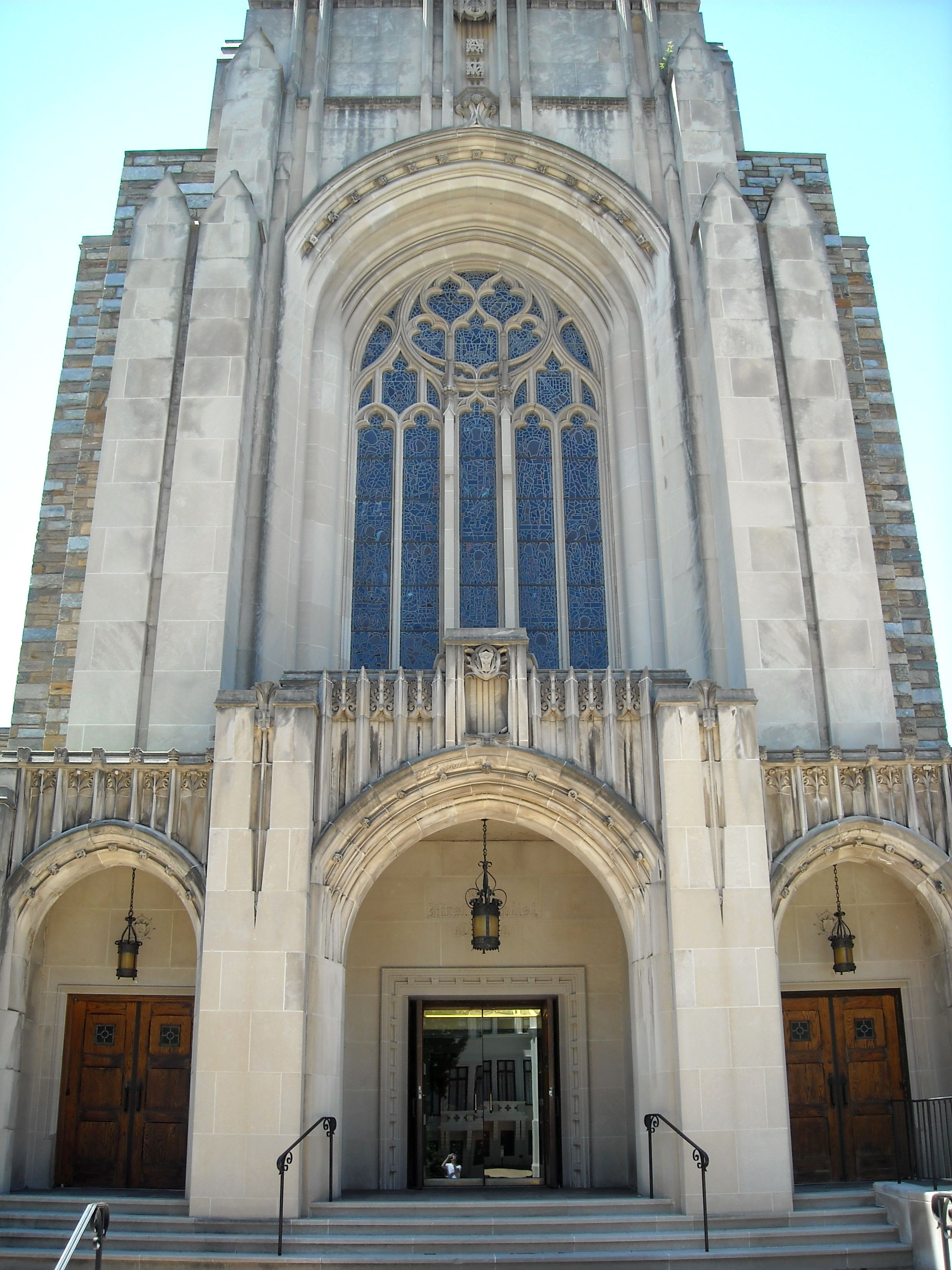
First Baptist Church, Washington, D.C.*

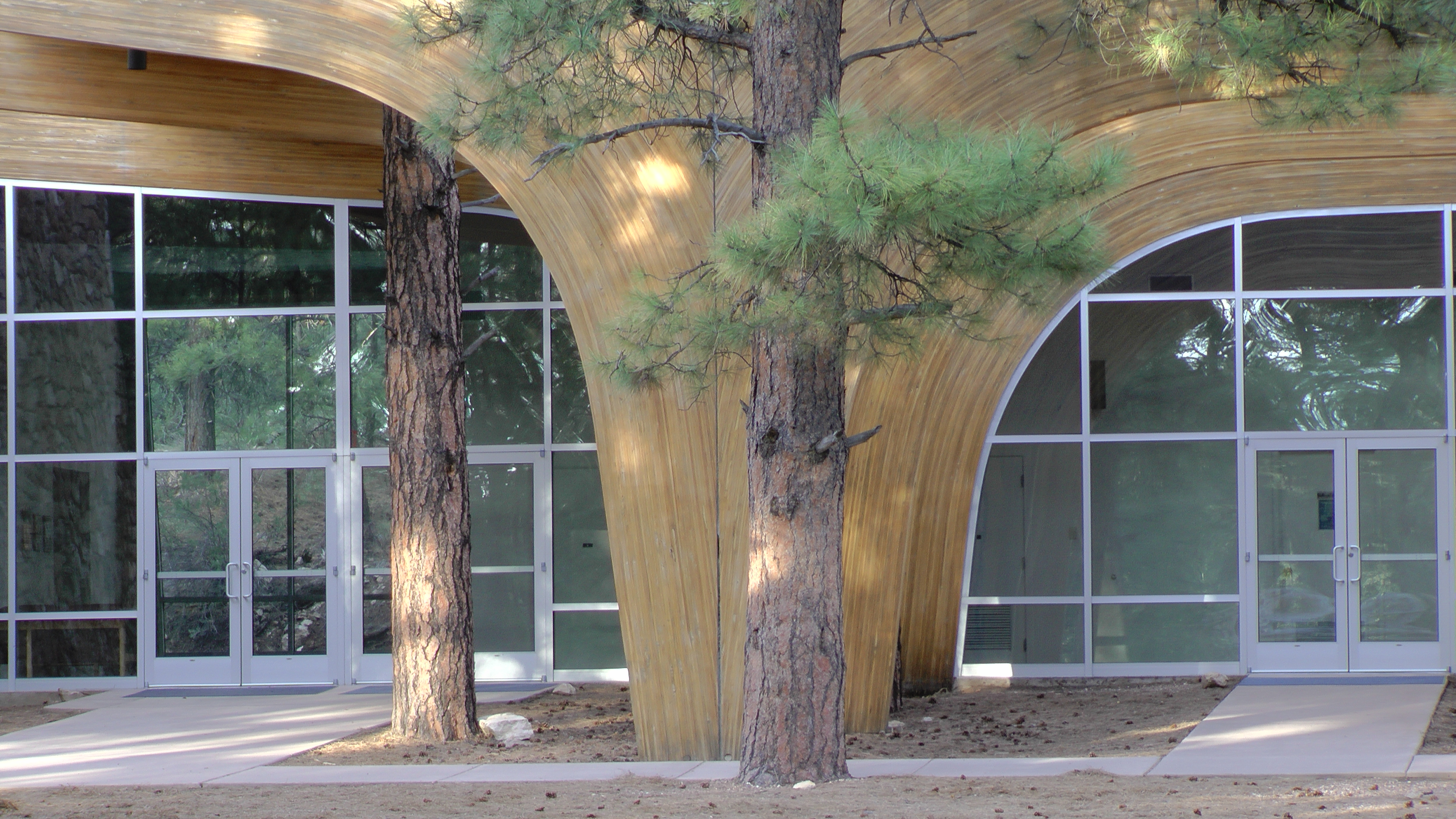
Shrine of the Ages, Grand Canyon, AZ

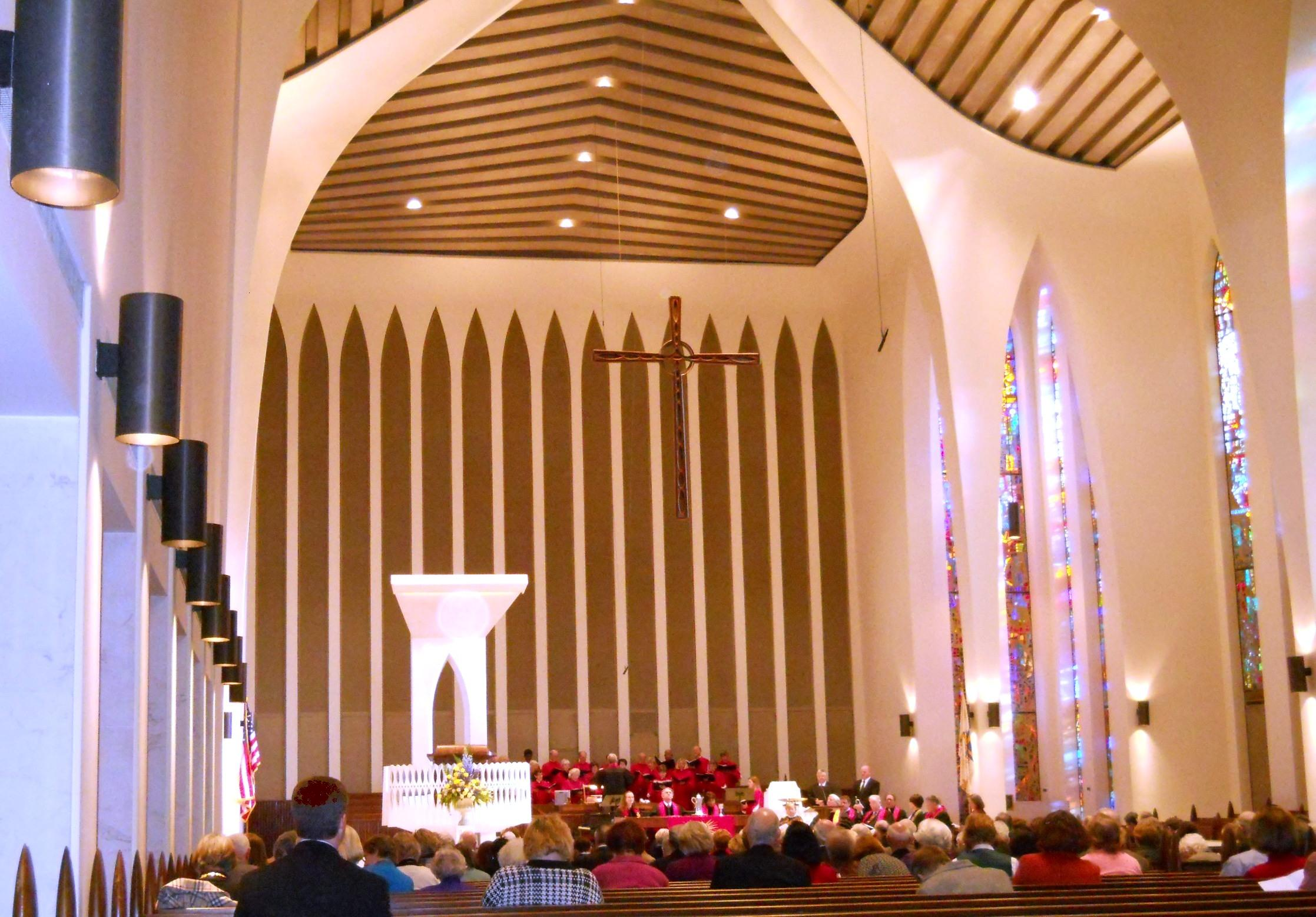
The Sanctuary of National Presbyterian Church

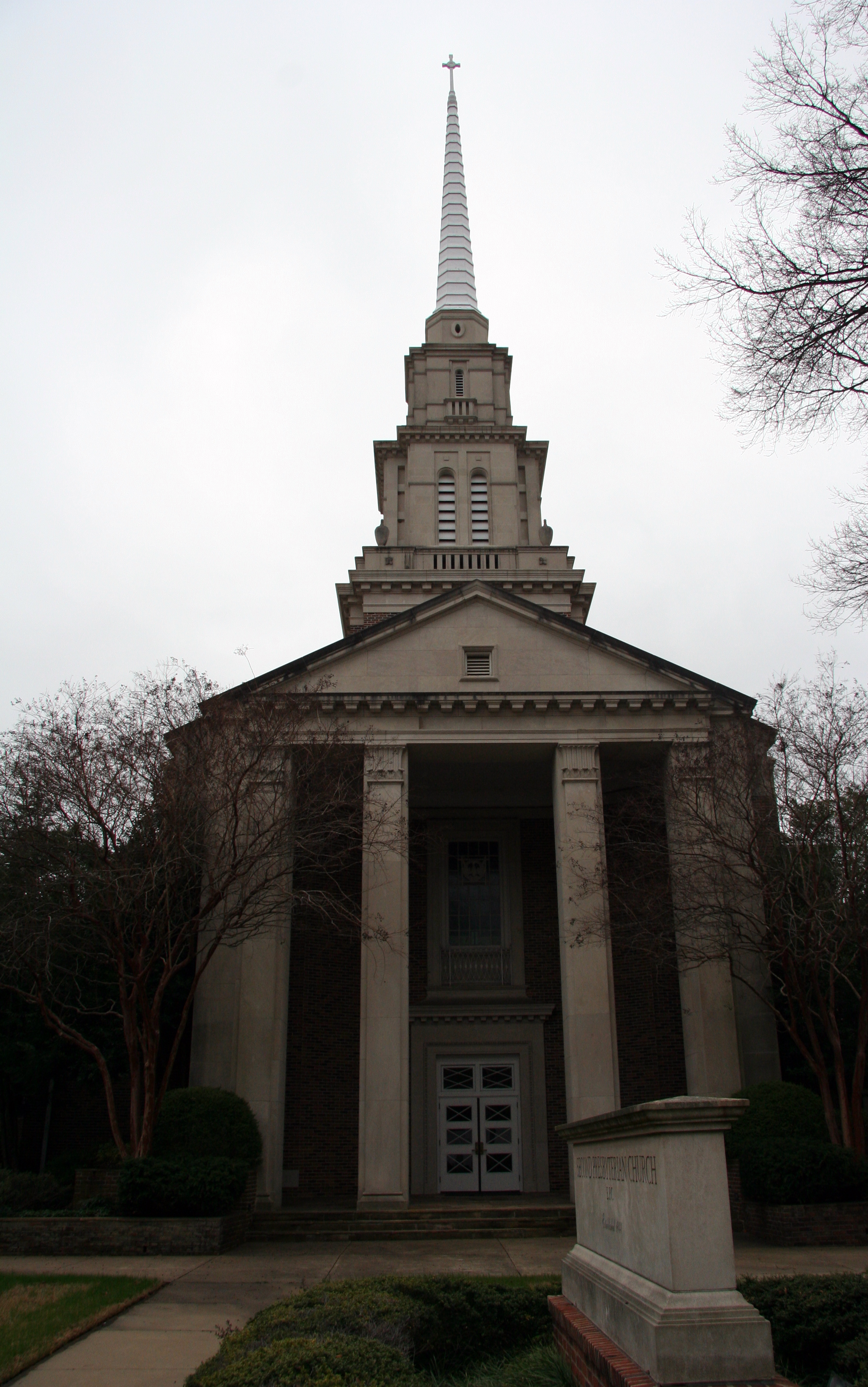
Second Presbyterian Church, Memphis, Tennessee*

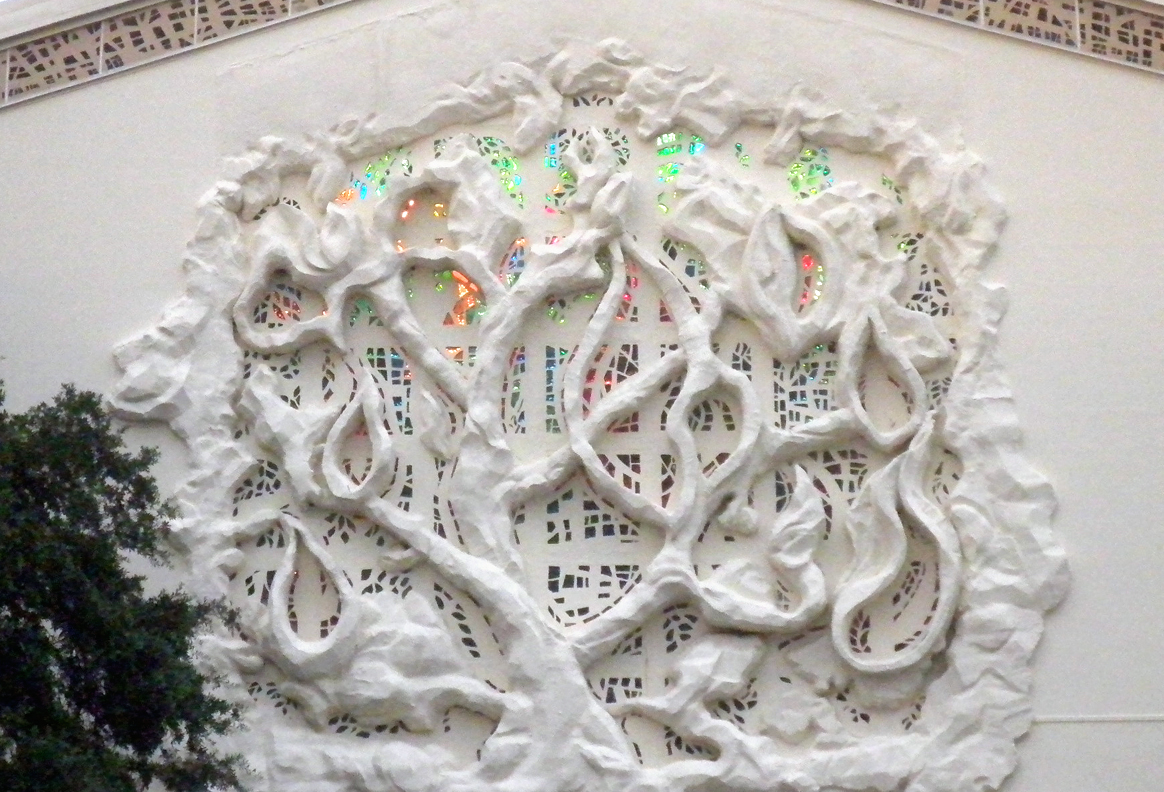
First Presbyterian Church, St. Petersburg, Florida

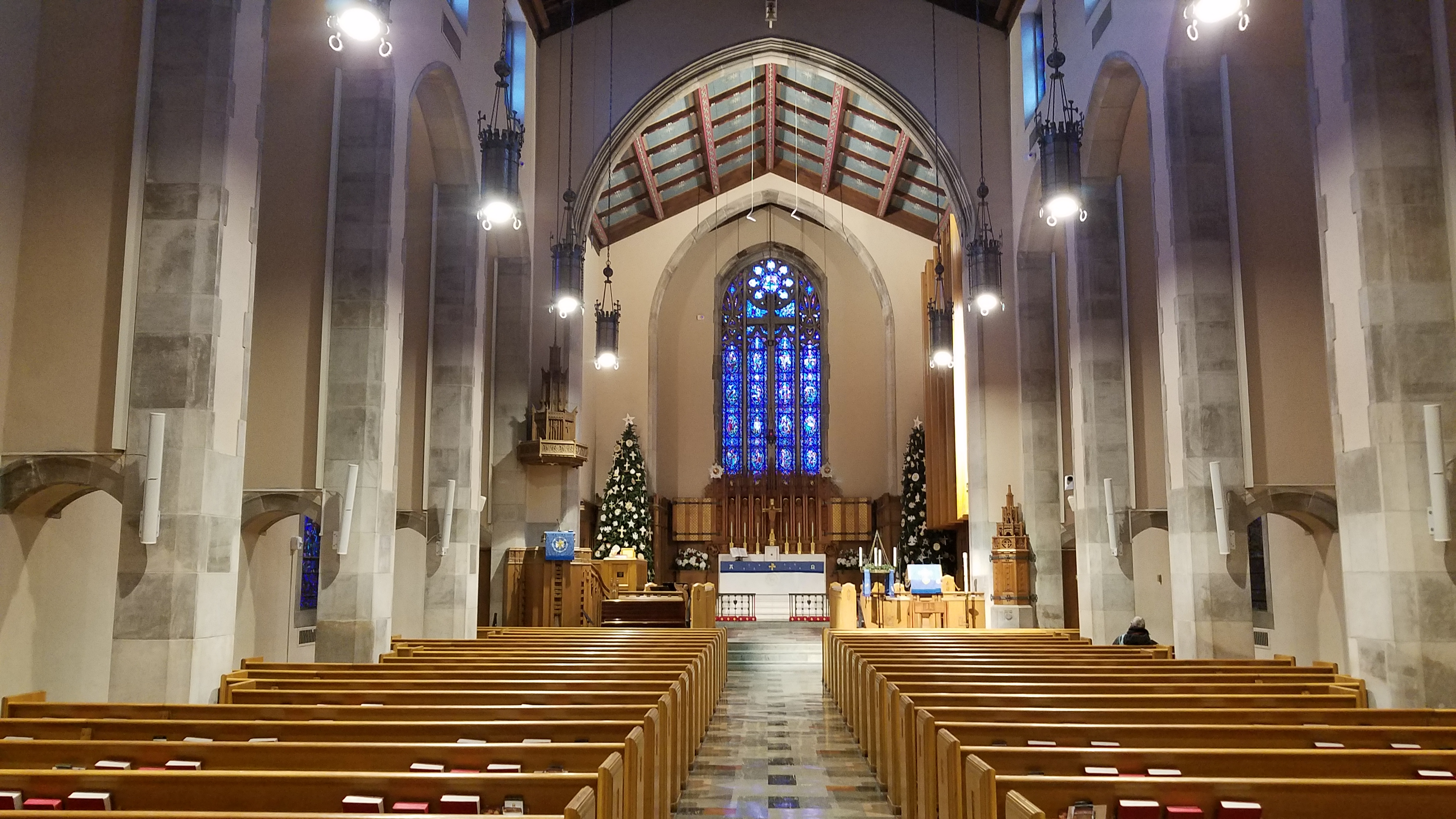
Interior of Lutheran Church of the Redeemer, Atlanta, Georgia
