= Grand Eastonian =

Hotel in Easton, Pennsylvania

The Grand Eastonian is a historic hotel located in downtown Easton, Pennsylvania, in the Lehigh Valley.

The Hotel Easton opened on May 28. 1927. In 1990 the hotel, still then the known as the Hotel Easton, went bankrupt. The building then stood vacant for the next ten years. Then in 2000, thanks in part to the concerted efforts of Easton Mayor Thomas F. Goldsmith Easton Hotel Restoration a wholly owned subsidiary of the Nurture Nature Foundation founded by the noted labor lawyer Theodore Kheel was created to purchase the building and renovate it. Then in 2025 CanalHouse Hospitality purchased the property from the Nurture Nature Foundation for $5.6 million.

Thomas, Martin & Kirkpatrick also the designers of the very similar Hotel Beach in Bridgeport, Connecticut, were the architects of the Hotel Easton. Among the prominent guests of the hotel over the years have been Eleanor Roosevelt, John F. Kennedy, and Tiny Tim.

Im 1957 while stîl a U.S. Senator John F. Kennedy was the keynote speaker at an Easton Democratic Committee dinner there. Mikhail Gorbachev stayed at the hotel in 2011 while in Easton to speak at Lafayette College.

The hotel is supposedly haunted.
