= Second Presbyterian Church (Memphis, Tennessee) (1952) =

Second Presbyterian Church
- Second Presbyterian Church, Memphis, Tennessee
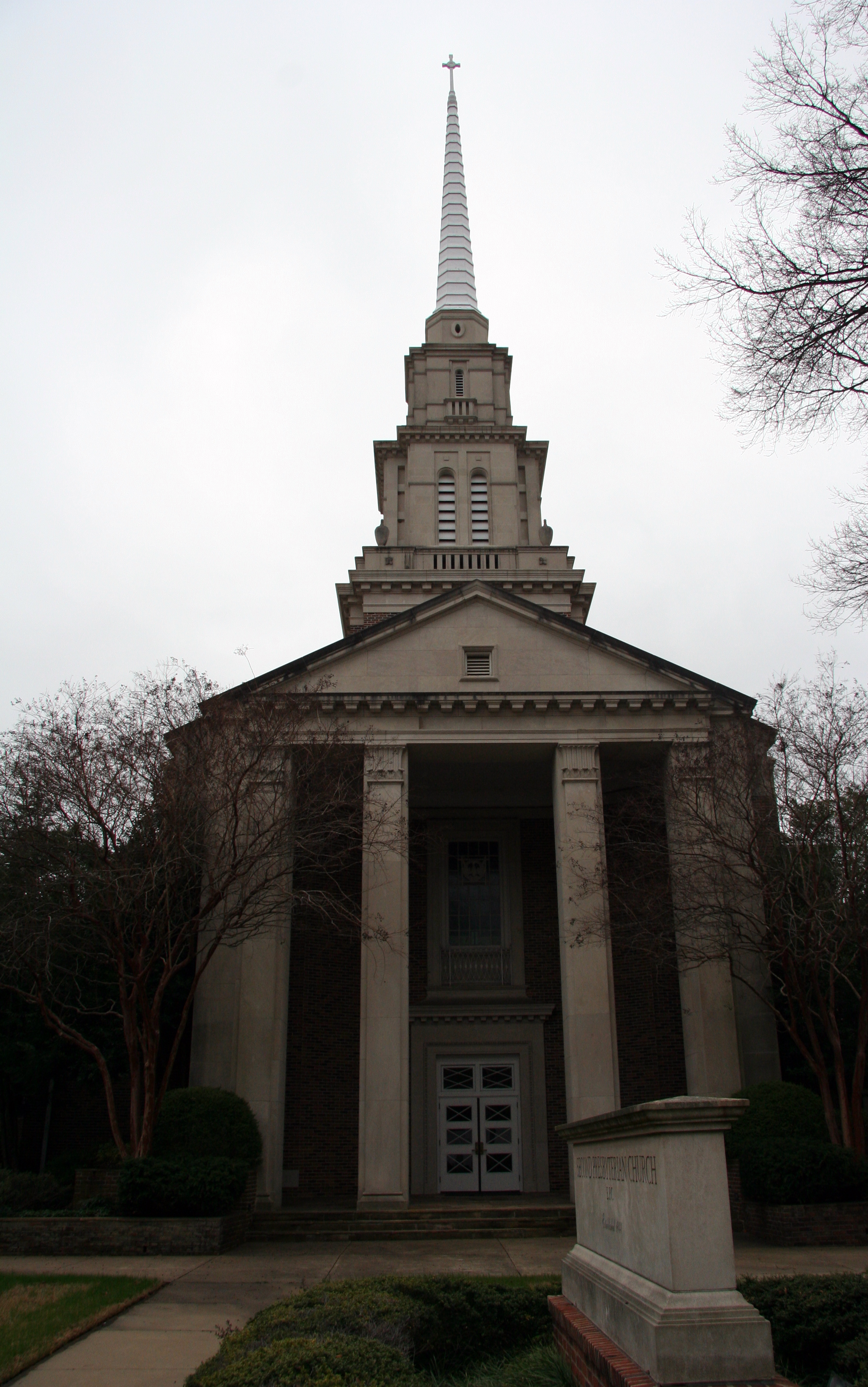
- The current home of the church, built in 1952

- Location within Tennessee
- 35°07′24.5″N 89°55′37.8″W
- Location: 4055 Poplar Avenue, Memphis, Tennessee
- Country: United States
- Denomination: Evangelical Presbyterian Church (United States)
- Previous denomination: Presbyterian Church in the United States
- Churchmanship: Evangelical, Reformed
- Website: 2pc.org

History
- Founded: 1844

Architecture
- Architect(s): Walter H. Thomas, Harold E. Wagoner
- Completed: 1952

Second Presbyterian Church of Memphis, Tennessee is a historic congregation, in the Evangelical Presbyterian Church, located at 4055 Poplar Avenue. Its former 1891 building is listed on the National Register of Historic Places but was sold by the congregation in 1952 when it moved to its current location. The present building was designed by Walter H. Thomas and Harold E. Wagoner, and received the Second Award for Large Churches from the Church Architectural Guild of America .
