= Trinity Presbyterian School =

Segregation academy in Alabama

Location
- 1700 East Trinity Boulevard; Montgomery, Alabama 36106; United States; 32°21′14″N 86°13′59″W

Information
- School type: Private day school
- Religious affiliation: Presbyterian
- Established: 1970 (56 years ago)
- CEEB code: 011914
- Headmaster: Suzanne Satcher
- Faculty: 69.4
- Grades: K-12
- Enrollment: 828 (2015)
- Colors: Red, white, and blue
- Athletics conference: AHSAA 4A
- Mascot: Wildcat
- Newspaper: Trinity Tribune
- Yearbook: The Crusader
- Website: trinitywildcats.com

Trinity Presbyterian School is a Christian day school serving grades K3-12th located in Montgomery, Alabama. It was founded in 1970.

== History ==
The school was founded by Trinity Presbyterian Church, an all-white church that resisted efforts for blacks to join the congregation.

Trinity School opened in a local church in 1970 with 200 students and 15 instructors, as Montgomery county public schools were being racially integrated. Some historians have described the school as a segregation academy. In 1986, two of the school's 645 students were black. In 2022, 91.3 % of the students were White and 5.7% were Black, while the Montgomery County School District was 6.9% White and 78.3% Black.

== Notable alumni ==
- Trace Bright, baseball player
