= Nurture Nature Center =

Science education center in Pennsylvania, US

Coordinates: 40.690940°N 75.213708°W

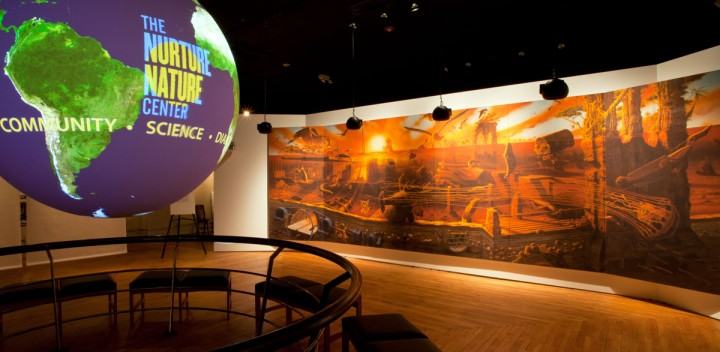
- Nickname: NNC
- Formation: 2007; 19 years ago
- Founder: Theodore W. Kheel
- Parent organization: Nurture Nature Foundation
- Affiliations: Buy Fresh Buy Local Greater Lehigh Valley
- Website: nurturenaturecenter.org

Nurture Nature Center (NNC) is a science-based education center focused on engaging the public on environmental risk topics. NNC is located in the city of Easton, Pennsylvania, roughly 55 miles (89 km) north of Philadelphia and 70 miles (110 km) west of New York City. It was founded by Theodore W. Kheel in response to flooding in 2004, 2005, and 2006 in the Delaware River Basin. The center's work today encompasses both national social science research and local community programming.

Also in 2000, The Nature Nauture Foundation through its wholly owned subsudiary Easton Hotel Restoration purchased the property of and restored the Hotel Easton (now the Grand Eastonian. The foundation sold the hotel to CanalHouse Hospitality for $5.6 million in 2025.

== Areas of work ==
NNC's social science research is conducted in partnership with the National Weather Service and other governmental agencies. It addresses risk communication regarding natural hazards, particularly extreme weather events and flooding. The research focuses on how to communicate about such risks both in communities impacted by river flooding and flash flooding as well as coastal communities like those impacted by Hurricane Sandy. The Nurture Nature Center has also worked with the local city government in Easton to complete a vulnerability assessment to fulfill the city’s Global Covenant of Mayors commitment.

NNC also organizes focus groups, surveys, and public meetings in Easton and the larger Lehigh Valley region about community knowledge of and priorities regarding environmental issues. The Center partners with other regional and state-wide organizations to create public education programs on topics like watershed protection.

Since opening its location in downtown Easton to the public in September 2011, NNC provides science education using NOAA's Science on a Sphere and exhibits art related to the environment. It is one of about 160 sites with the sphere world-wide. The Center receives federal grants as well as state support to develop science education and art programming.

== See also ==
- List of science centers
