= Lutheran Church of the Redeemer (Atlanta) =

Lutheran church in Atlanta, Georgia, US

- Evangelical Lutheran Church of the Redeemer
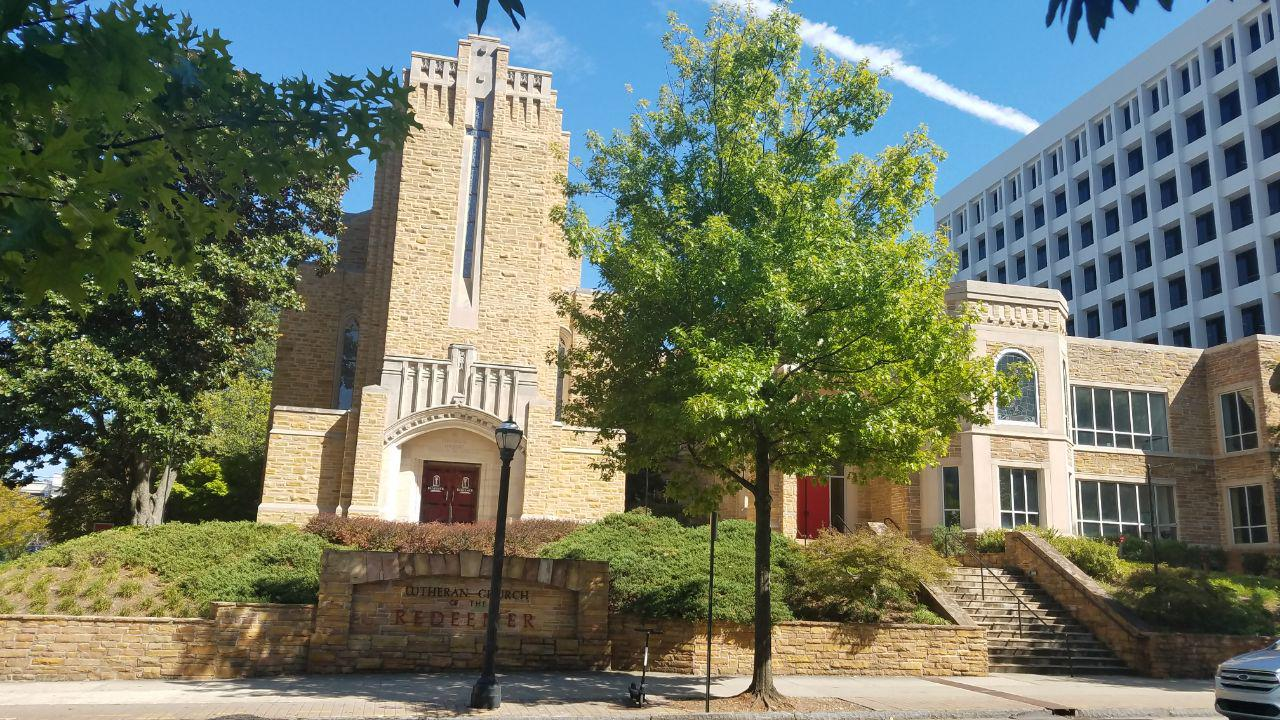
- The church as seen in 2019

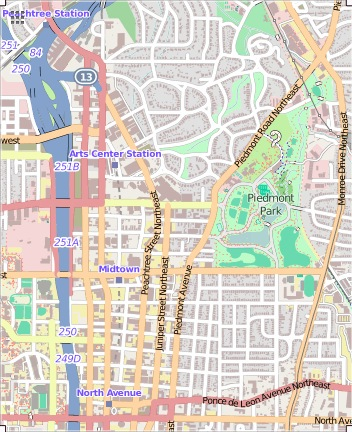
- 33.774525°N 84.384209°W
- Location: 731 Peachtree Street NE; Atlanta, Georgia 30308
- Denomination: Evangelical Lutheran Church in America
- Website: www.redeemer.org

History
- Founded: March 15, 1903
- Dedication: September 7, 1952

Architecture
- Architect: Harold E. Wagoner
- Style: Gothic
- Completed: 1952

The Lutheran Church of the Redeemer is a Lutheran church in midtown Atlanta, Georgia. The congregation was founded in the city in 1903, with the current building constructed in 1952.

== History ==
The church was originally founded with 39 charter members on March 15, 1903, as the first English-speaking Lutheran congregation in Atlanta (St. John's Lutheran Church, founded in 1869 as a German-speaking church, was the first Lutheran church in Atlanta). The congregation originally held service at a local YMCA. The first church building was constructed in 1905 near the Georgia State Capitol in downtown Atlanta. The congregation experienced significant growth during World War I as many members of St. John's became members of Redeemer due to anti-German sentiment.

In 1937, the congregation moved to its current location at the intersection of Peachtree Street and Fourth Street in midtown Atlanta, near Saint Mark Methodist Church. This building was nicknamed the "Church of the Lighted Window" because it had a large stained glass window featuring the Good Shepherd facing Peachtree Street. The current building, a gothic structure built primarily of Tennessee quartzite and Indiana limestone, was constructed in 1952 and was designed by Harold E. Wagoner, a notable ecclesiastical architect. The building's dedication occurred on September 7 of that year. In 2002, the church dedicated a new pipe organ built by Orgues Létourneau Limitée: the Opus 80.

Early in its history, Redeemer became affiliated with the United Synod of the Evangelical Lutheran Church in the South. Through a series of church unions, Redeemer is a member of the Evangelical Lutheran Church in America (ELCA) and is the largest congregation within the church's Southeastern Synod. In 2015, Timothy Smith, the senior priest at Redeemer, was elected bishop of the North Carolina Synod of the ELCA, replacing retiring bishop Leonard Bolick.

== Gallery ==
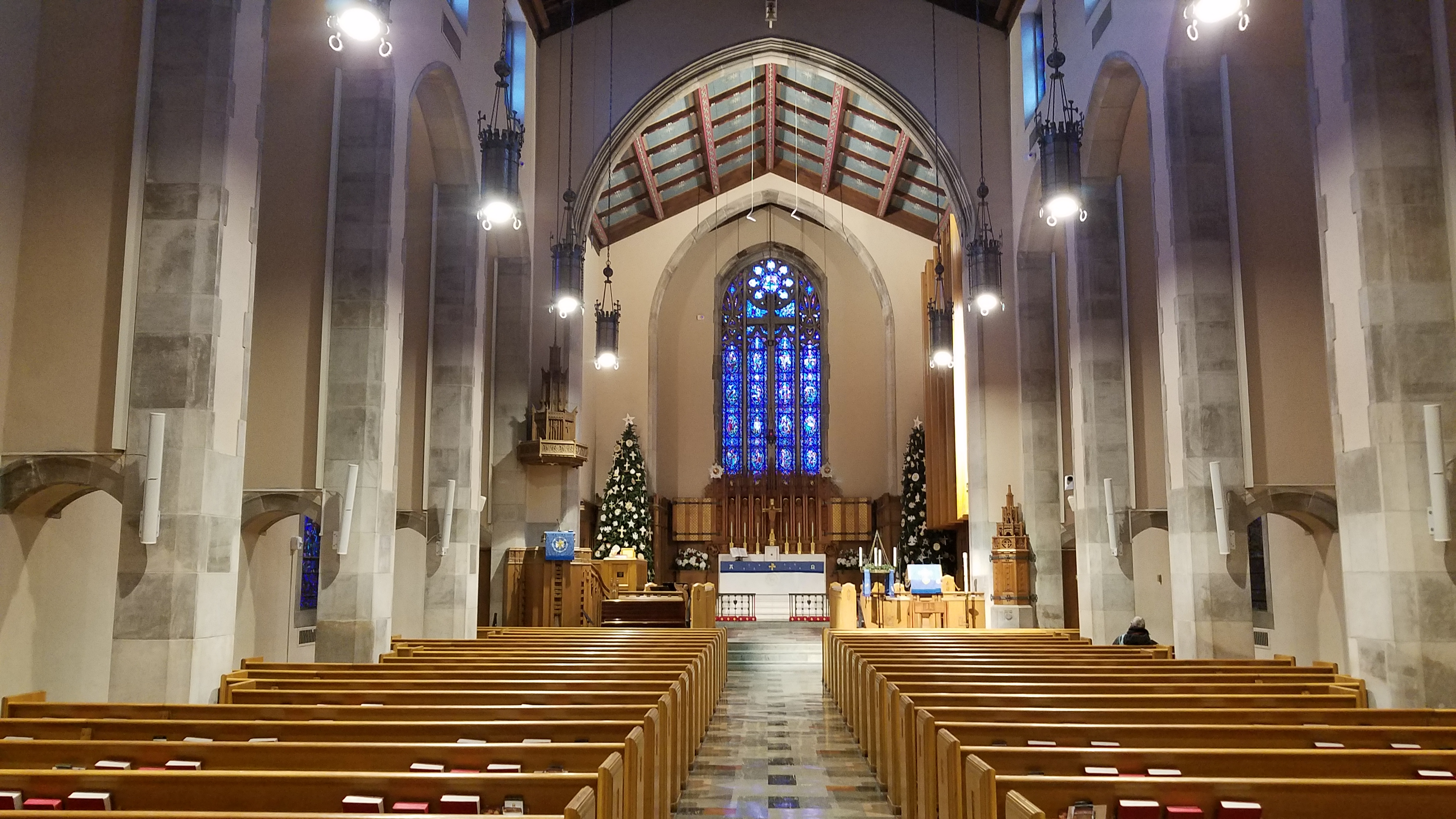
Interior

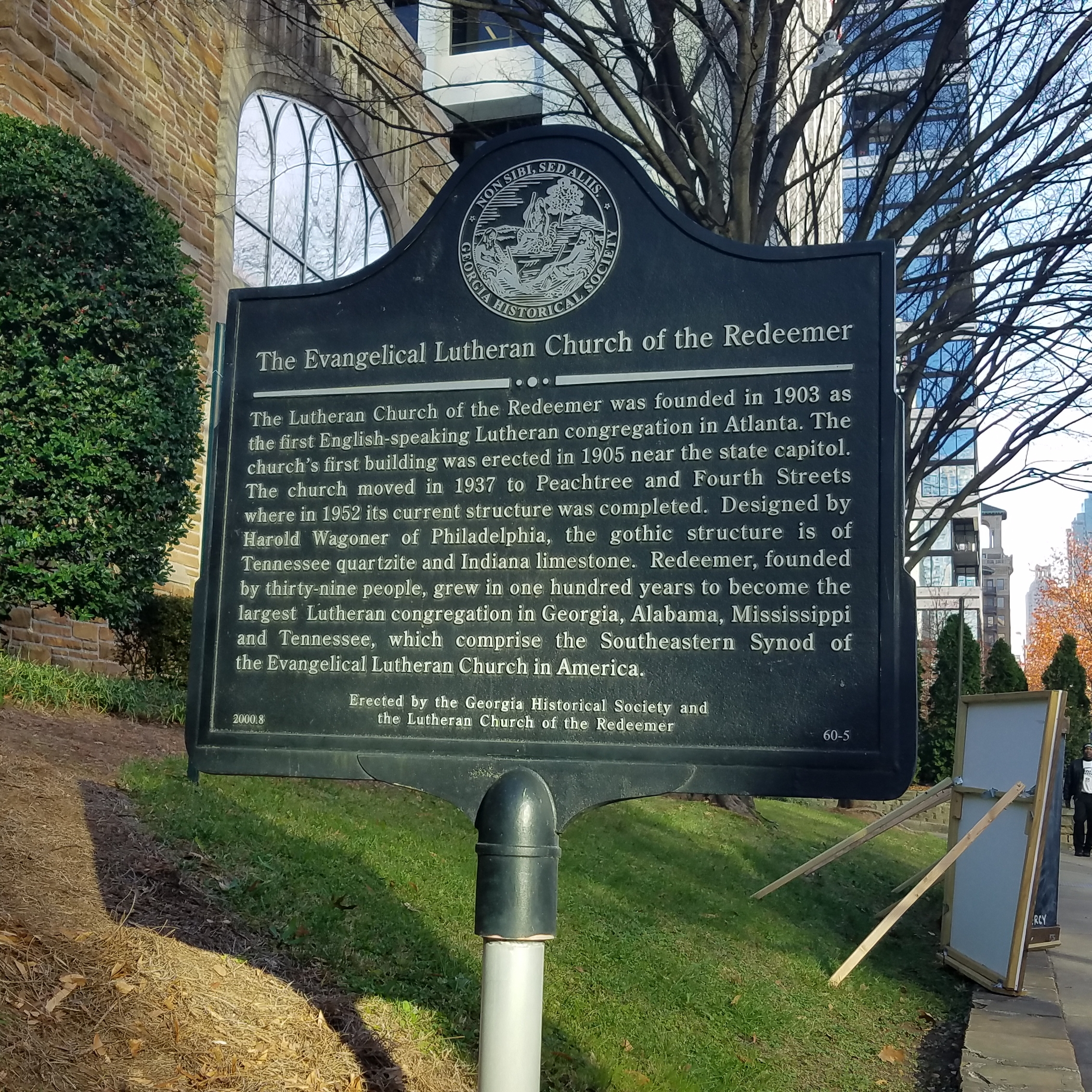
Georgia Historical Marker

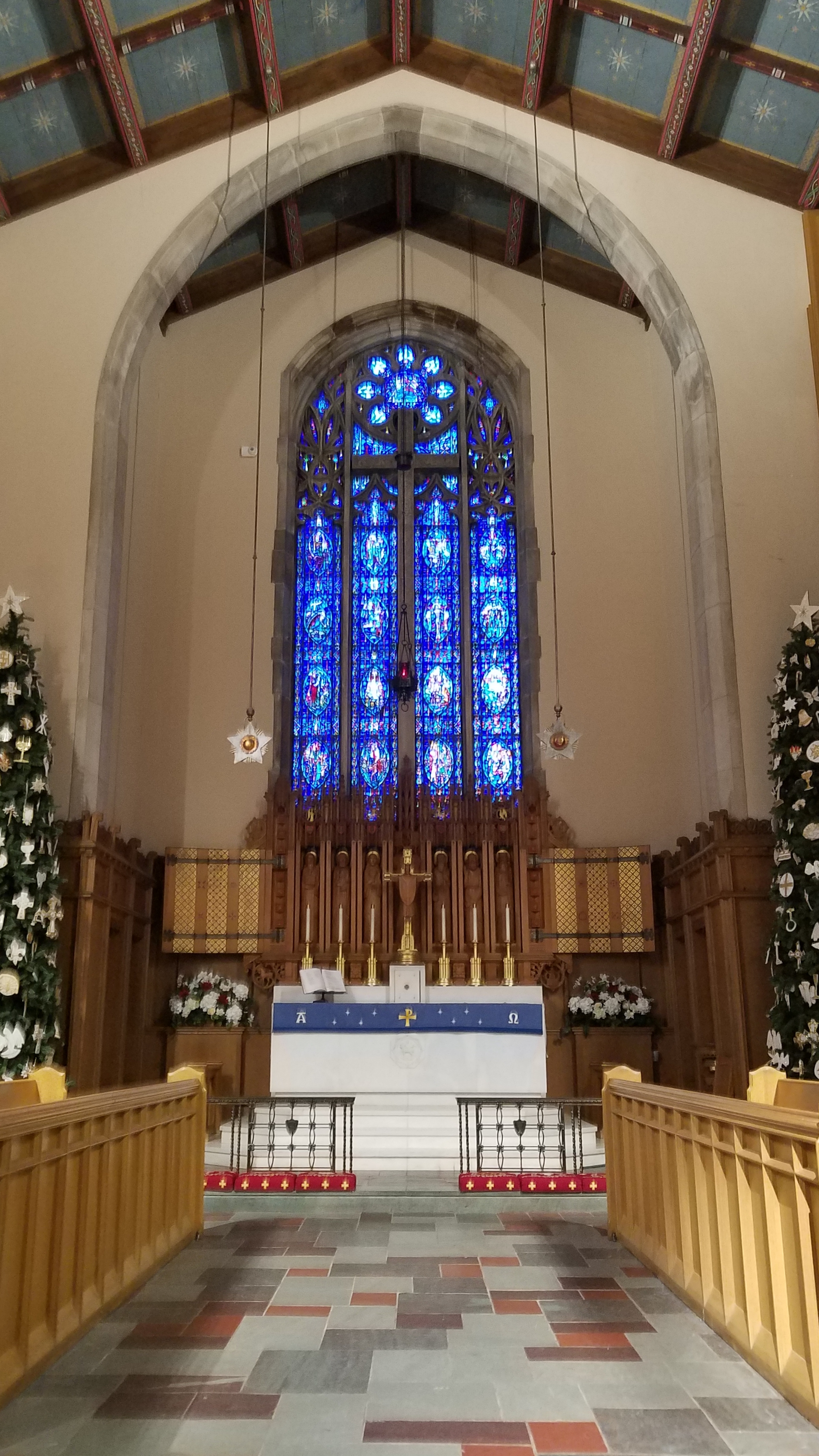
Altar

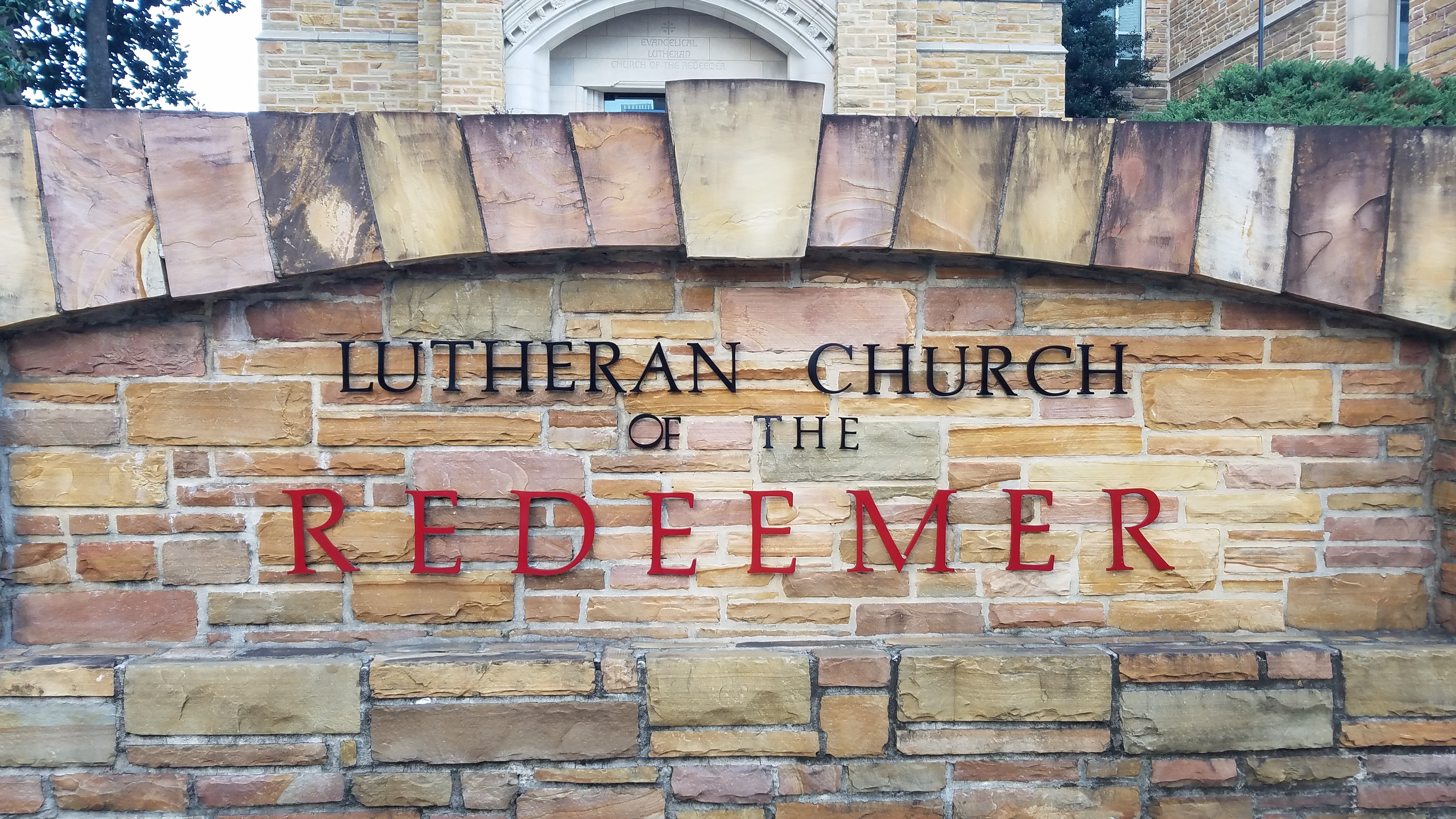
Sign

== Bibliography ==
- Ahrendt, Theodore G. (December 1969). "A History of Lutheranism in Atlanta". Atlanta Historical Bulletin. 14 (4). Atlanta Historical Society: 26–33 – via Atlanta History Center.
