= The First Baptist Church of the City of Washington, D.C. =

First Baptist Church
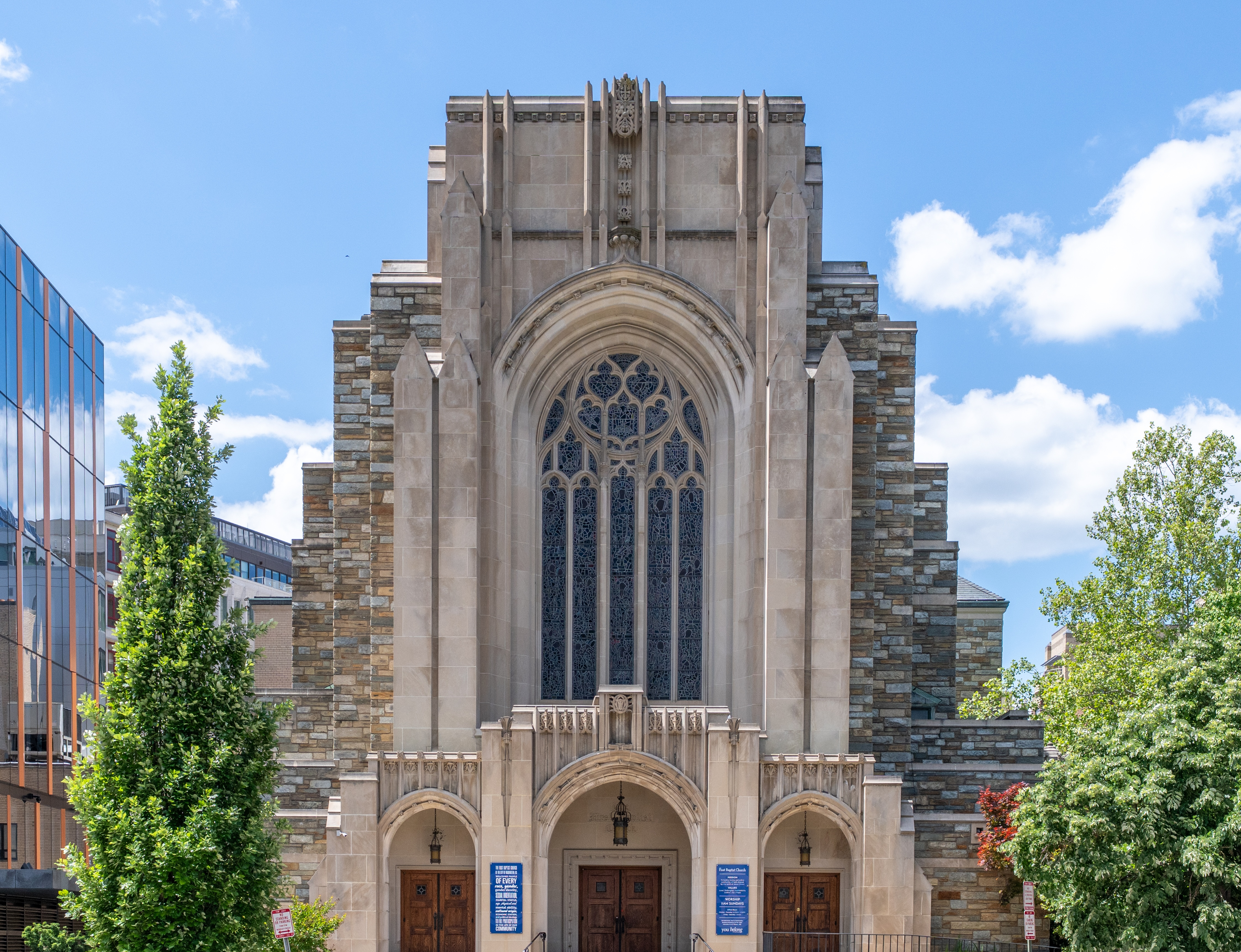

- Location within District of Columbia
- 38°54′30.5″N 77°2′12.7″W
- Location: 1328 16th Street NW, Washington, D.C.
- Country: United States
- Denomination: Baptist
- Website: firstbaptistdc.org

Architecture
- Architect(s): Walter H. Thomas and Harold E. Wagoner
- Completed: 1955

The First Baptist Church of the City of Washington, D.C. is a progressive Baptist church at 1328 16th Street NW, Washington, D.C. First Baptist partners with the Alliance of Baptists, American Baptist Churches USA, Cooperative Baptist Fellowship, and the District of Columbia Baptist Convention.

== History ==
The church was founded in 1801 when believers gathered in the U.S. Treasury building. In March 1802, six believers and four pastors established the church in a private home.

By the fall of 1802, a brick church 42 feet by 32 feet had been completed and dedicated. The Rev. William Parkinson, chaplain of the House of Representatives, gave the dedication sermon.

It was not until 1809 that the building was equipped with pews, which were rented to the congregation to cover expenses.

The church has built and occupied five buildings on four sites, including one building that afterward became the first Ford's Theater.

The congregation moved to its current location at 16th and O Streets NW in 1890. In the 1950s, it replaced their church building with a new sanctuary dedicated on Christmas Day 1955.

“There are stones in this building from a church in Japan that was destroyed by the first atom bomb; stones from churches in Berlin and Hamburg, also destroyed in bombing raids during World War II; and stones from a mission church in Africa, from a church in Argentina and from Westminster Abbey and St. Paul’s Cathedral in London.”

Famous attendees through history include Presidents Harry S. Truman and Jimmy Carter. President Truman did not join First Baptist but appreciated his time at the church. In remarks to the Associated Church Press on April 21, 1949, he said:

"You know, the President has to be very careful, when he goes to church, that he goes to church for the purpose of worshiping God and not for the purpose of being a circus. A great many people, if they find that the President, not Harry Truman, but the President, is going to be in church, they will go to church. Well, that is not the right frame of mind in which to go to church, and I don't cater to that sort of program. I go because I want to go and because I think I ought to go, and not for the purpose of making a show. The First Baptist Church treats me just the way I want to be treated."

After two pre-inaugural services at First Baptist, President Carter joined the church on the first Sunday of his presidency, Jan. 23, 1977, along with his wife Rosalynn and his son Chip. Daughter Amy, age 9, was baptized at the church Feb. 6, 1977. During the 48 months of his term, President Carter attended Sunday services at First Baptist more than 70 times, according to the National Archives. Once a month, he would teach Sunday School to the church’s Couples Class. At the class's annual banquet in October 1977, President Carter made remarks that echoed Truman's:

“You have made our lives normal lives. You have given us stability in a position that is inherently sometimes unstable. A President of our country can be an isolated person. You have taken us in, and we are indebted to you. Thank you very much."

In 2025, it inaugurated a new community building, including meeting spaces, a youth lounge and offices.

== Beliefs ==
=== Marriage ===
The church has an inclusive vision and celebrates both opposite-sex marriages and same-sex marriages.

== See also ==
- Sixteenth Street Historic District
- The First Baptist Church of the City of Washington, D.C. - White House Historical Association (whitehousehistory.org)
