= Churchmanship =

Anglican and Lutheran schools of thought

Churchmanship (or tradition, in most official contexts) is a way of talking about and labelling different tendencies, parties, or schools of thought within the Church of England and the sister churches of the Anglican Communion. The term has at times been used in Lutheranism in a somewhat similar fashion.

== Anglicanism ==
In Anglicanism, 'parties' of churchmanship include, from highest to lowest: High church/Anglo-Catholic (Anglo-Papalist, Prayer Book/'English' Catholic, Liberal Anglo-Catholic); Central church (also known as 'Old High church'); Broad church/Latitudinarian (mostly associated with Liberal Christianity); and Low church/Evangelical (Conservative, Open, Charismatic).

The term is derived from the older noun churchman, which originally meant an ecclesiastic or clergyman but, some while before 1677, it was extended to people who were strong supporters of the Church of England and, by the nineteenth century, was used to distinguish between Anglicans and Dissenters. The word "churchmanship" itself was first used in 1680 to refer to the attitude of these supporters but later acquired its modern meaning. While many Anglicans are content to label their own churchmanship, not all Anglicans would feel happy to be described as anything but "Anglican". Today, in official contexts, the term "tradition" is sometimes preferred.

The Church of England was never monolithic in its views and had different factions or traditions within it throughout its history. Immediately after the Second Act of Supremacy and for length of the reigns of Elisabeth I and James I, the parties within the church were the (Elizabethan) Conformists and the Puritans, both of which were Calvinist. With the accession of Charles I, the spread of Arminianism and the naming of William Laud as Archbishop of Canterbury, Calvinism declined within the conformist camp and the church's factions gradually became Laudianism and Puritanism. After the Great Ejection, most puritans became Nonconformists and were no longer part of the established church. It is also during the middle of the seventeenth century that Latitudinarians appear. In the eighteenth century, the Evangelical Revival gave rise to the Evangelical faction, and in the nineteenth century, the Oxford Movement resulted in the Anglo-Catholic tradition.

"High" and "Low", the oldest labels, date from the late seventeenth century and originally described opposing political attitudes to the relation between the Church of England and the civil power. Their meaning shifted as historical settings changed and, towards the end of the nineteenth century, came to be used to describe different views on the liturgical practices and ceremonial to be used in worship. Shortly after the introduction of this "High/Low" distinction, a segment of the "Low" church was nicknamed Latitudinarian because of its relative indifference to doctrinal definition and significance. In the nineteenth century, this 'group' gave birth to the Broad church, which, in turn, produced the "Modernist" movement of the first half of the twentieth century. Today, the "parties" are usually thought of as Anglo-Catholics, evangelical Anglicans, and Liberals and, with the exception of "High church", the remaining terms are mainly used to refer to past history. The precise shades of meaning of any term vary from user to user and mixed descriptors such as liberal Catholic are found. Today "Broad church" has come to refer to Anglicans who are neither high nor low/evangelical.

It is an Anglican commonplace to say that authority in the Church has three sources: Scripture, Reason, and Tradition. In general, the Evangelical Low churchman tends to put more emphasis upon Scripture, the Broad churchman and the Liberal upon reason, and the High churchman and the Anglo-Catholic upon tradition. The emphasis on "parties" and differences is necessary but in itself gives an incomplete picture. Cyril Garbett (later Archbishop of York) wrote of his coming to the Diocese of Southwark:

I found the different parties strongly represented with their own organizations and federations... But where there was true reverence and devotion I never felt any difficulty in worshipping and preaching in an Anglo-Catholic church in the morning and in an Evangelical church in the evening"... and when there was a call for united action... the clergy and laity without distinction of party were ready to join in prayer, work and sacrifice.

— Garbett,

and William Gibson commented that

the historical attention given to the fleeting moments of controversy in the eighteenth century has masked the widespread and profound commitment to peace and tranquility among both the clergy and the laity.... High Church and Low Church were not exclusive categories of thought and churchmanship. They were blurred and broad streams within Anglicanism that often merged, overlapped and coincided.

— Gibson,

A traditional poem to describe churchmanship is "Low and Lazy, Broad and Hazy, and High and Crazy." Lazy refers to simpler worship, hazy to unclear tradition or beliefs, and crazy to excessive ceremonialism; but the author of the poem may have been a humorist.

In the United States, a "churchman" is typically understood to mean a member (irrespective of gender) of The Episcopal Church (TEC). Usage of the term began in the nineteenth century and has been modified in the twentieth century.

== Lutheranism ==
Lutheranism has traditionally retained cohesiveness due to doctrinal unity on the Book of Concord. However, in modern times, the concept of churchmanship may be used in Lutheranism as well and can include, from highest to lowest: High church/Evangelical Catholic, Confessional, Liberal, and Pietist.

There may be overlap between these categories; for example, the Lutheran Church–International (LC–I) is a confessional Lutheran denomination of Evangelical Catholic churchmanship.

== Gallery ==
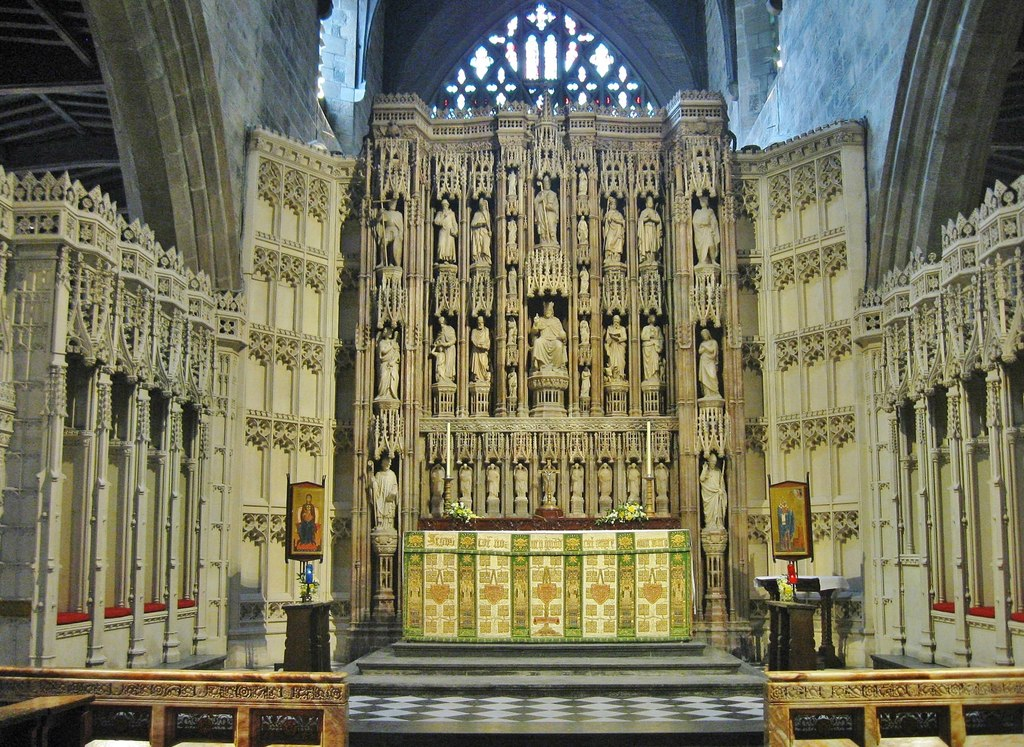
Chancel of Newcastle Cathedral (High Church)

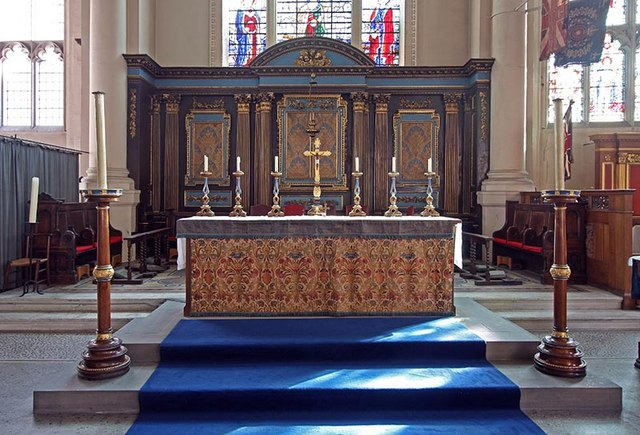
Altar of St Sepulchre-without-Newgate (Low Church)

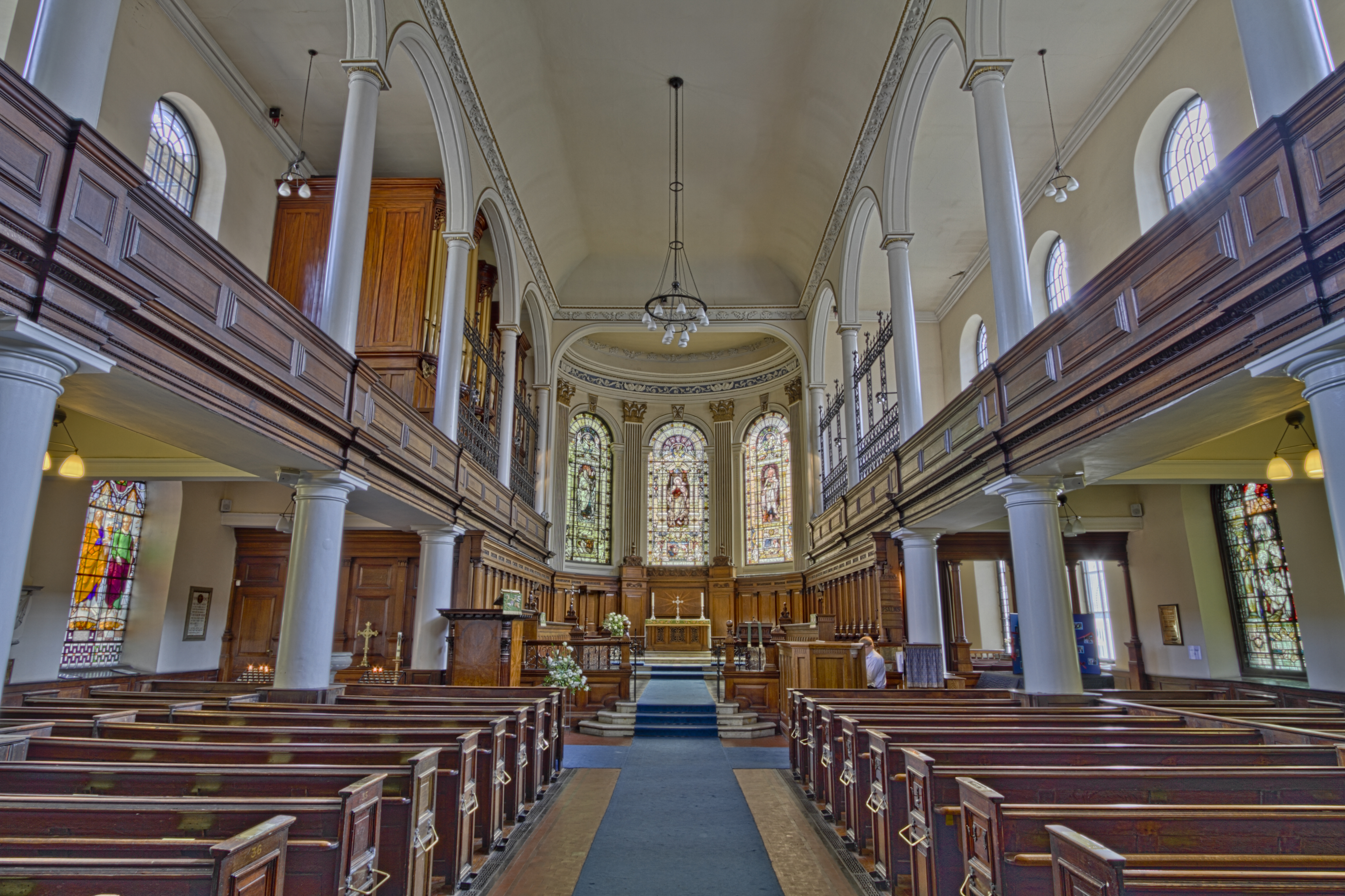
Interior of St Ann's Church, Manchester (Broad Church)

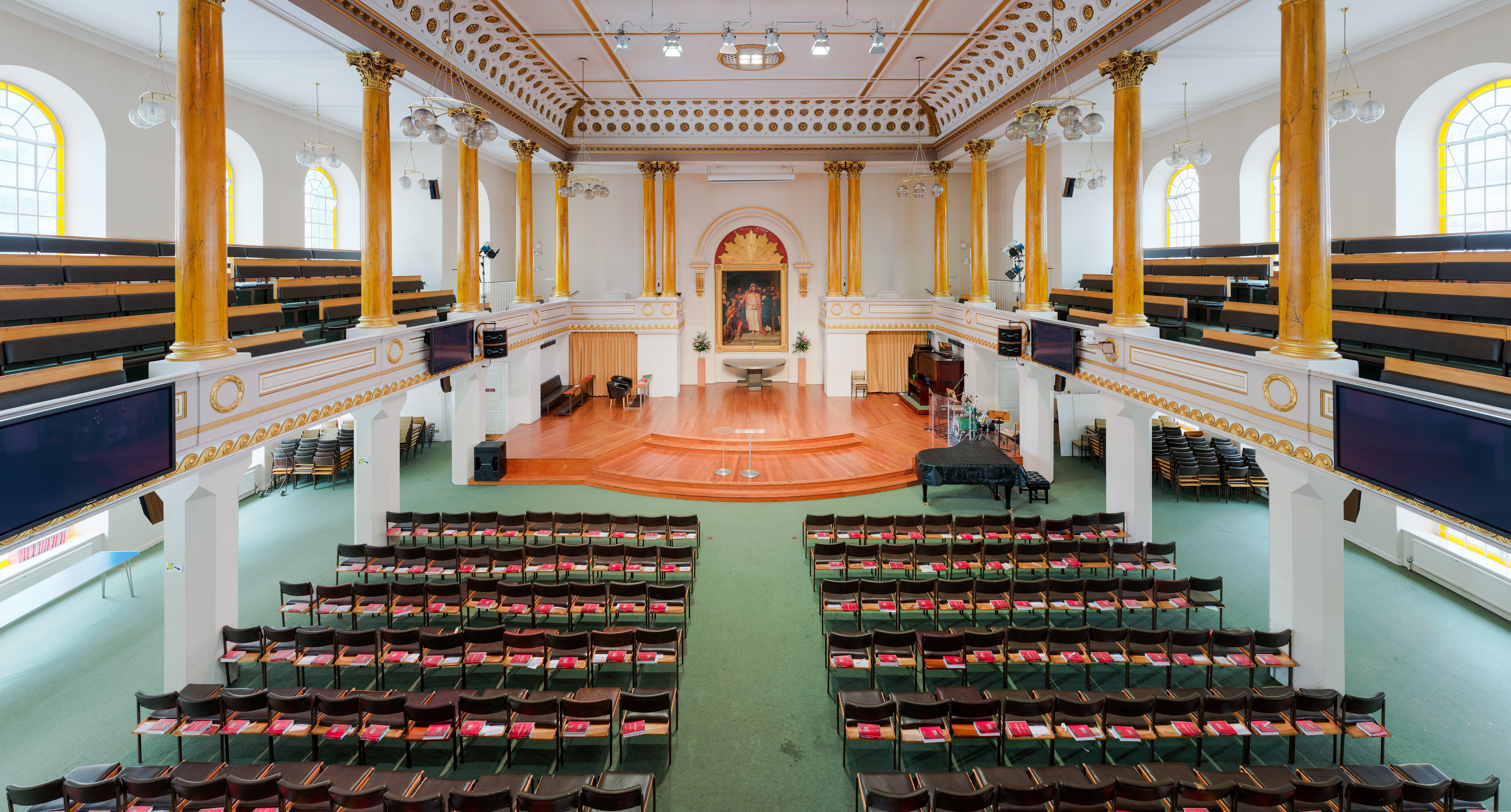
Interior of All Souls Church, Langham Place (Conservative Evangelical Anglicanism)

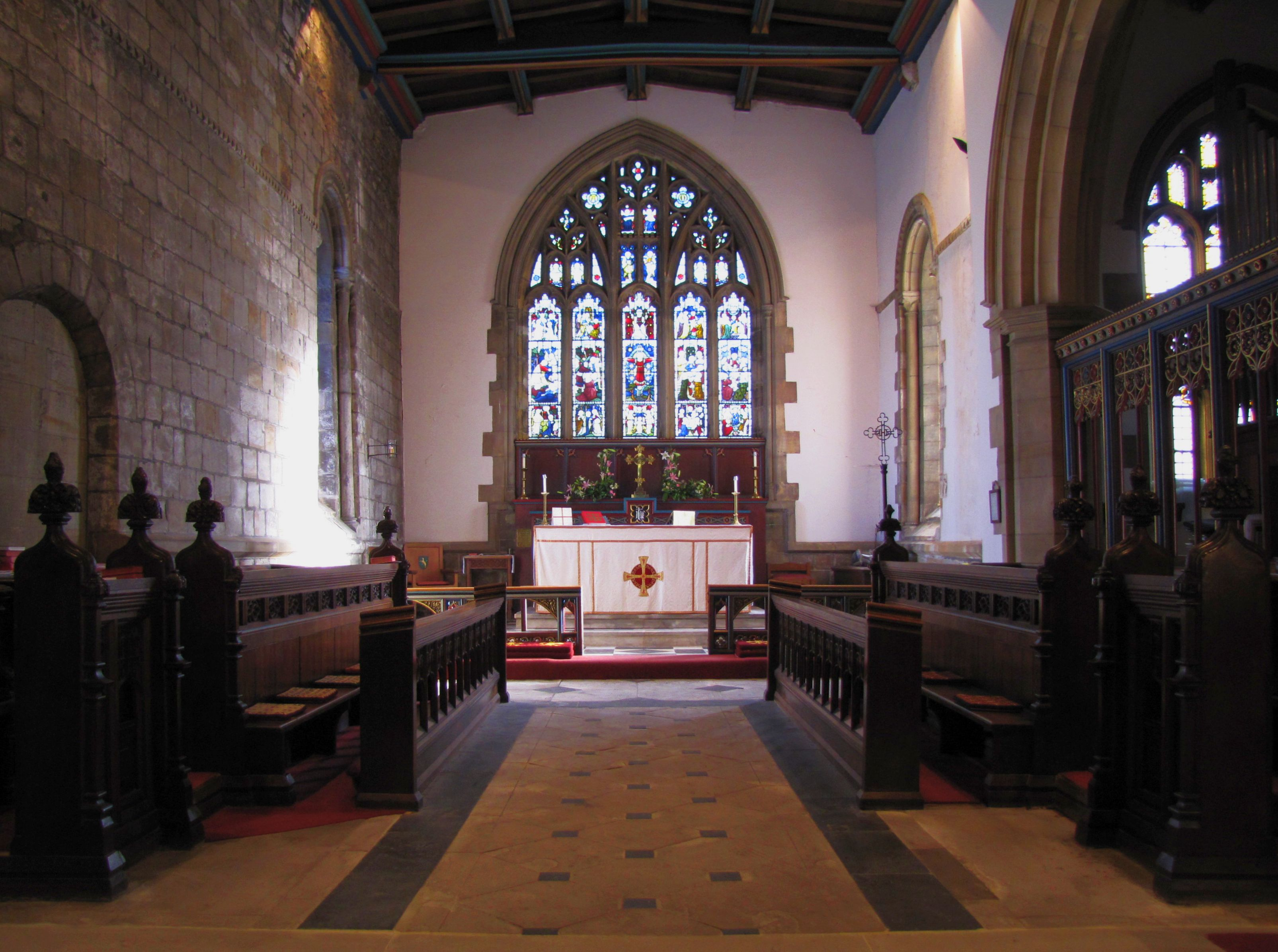
Interior of St Giles Church, Durham (Central churchmanship)

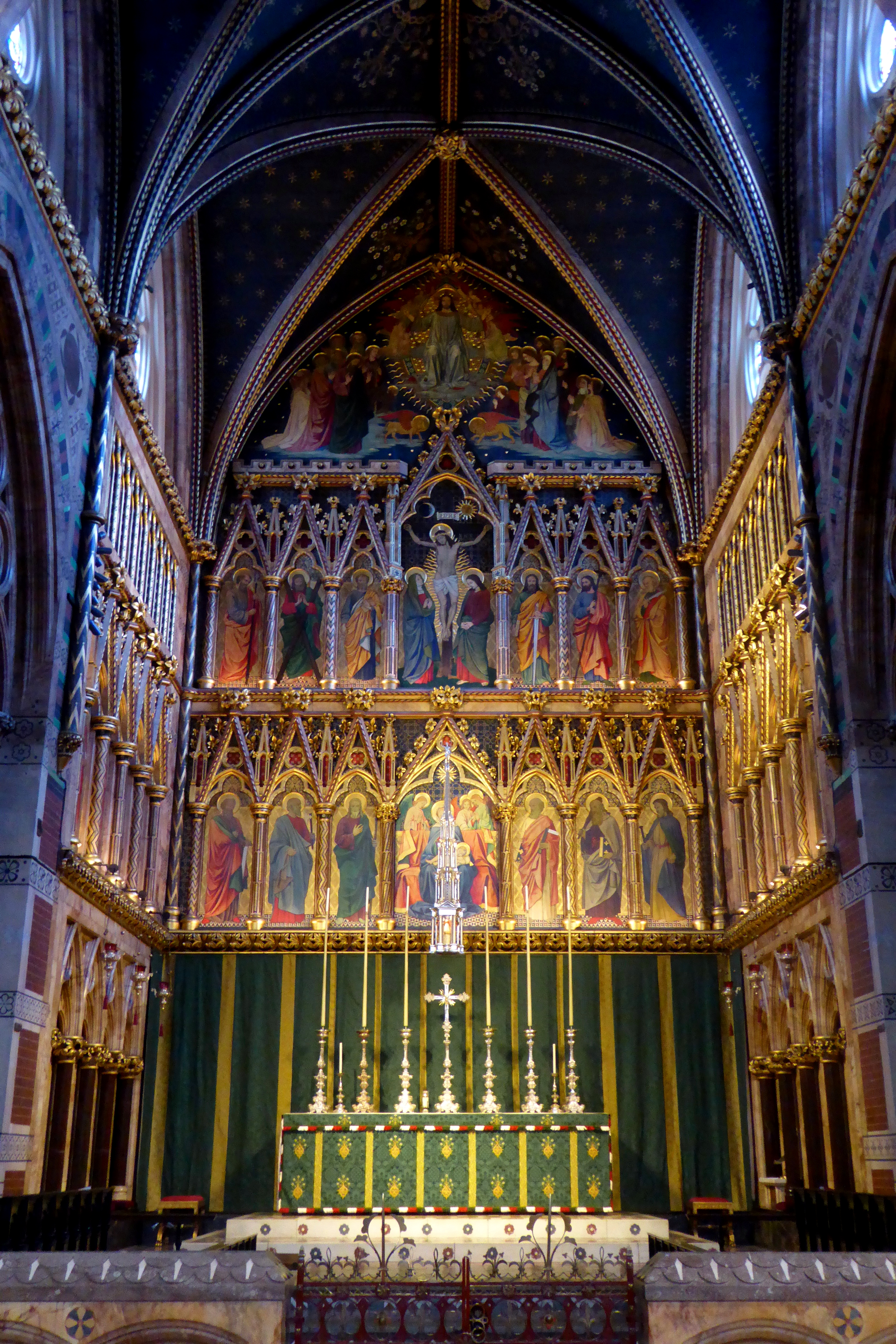
Chancel of All Saints, Margaret Street (Anglo-Catholicism)

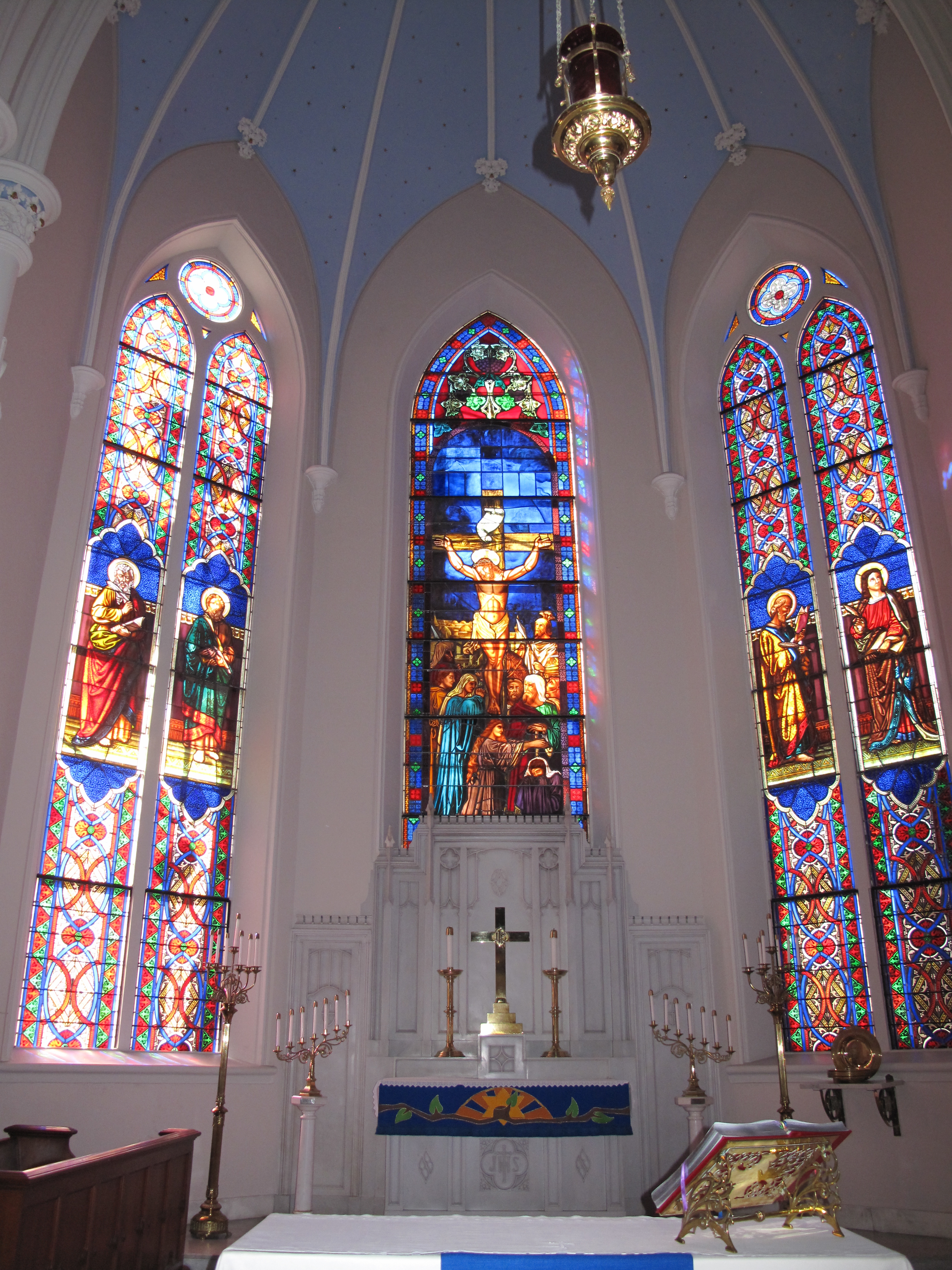
Chancel of St. Matthew's German Evangelical Lutheran Church (Evangelical Catholic)

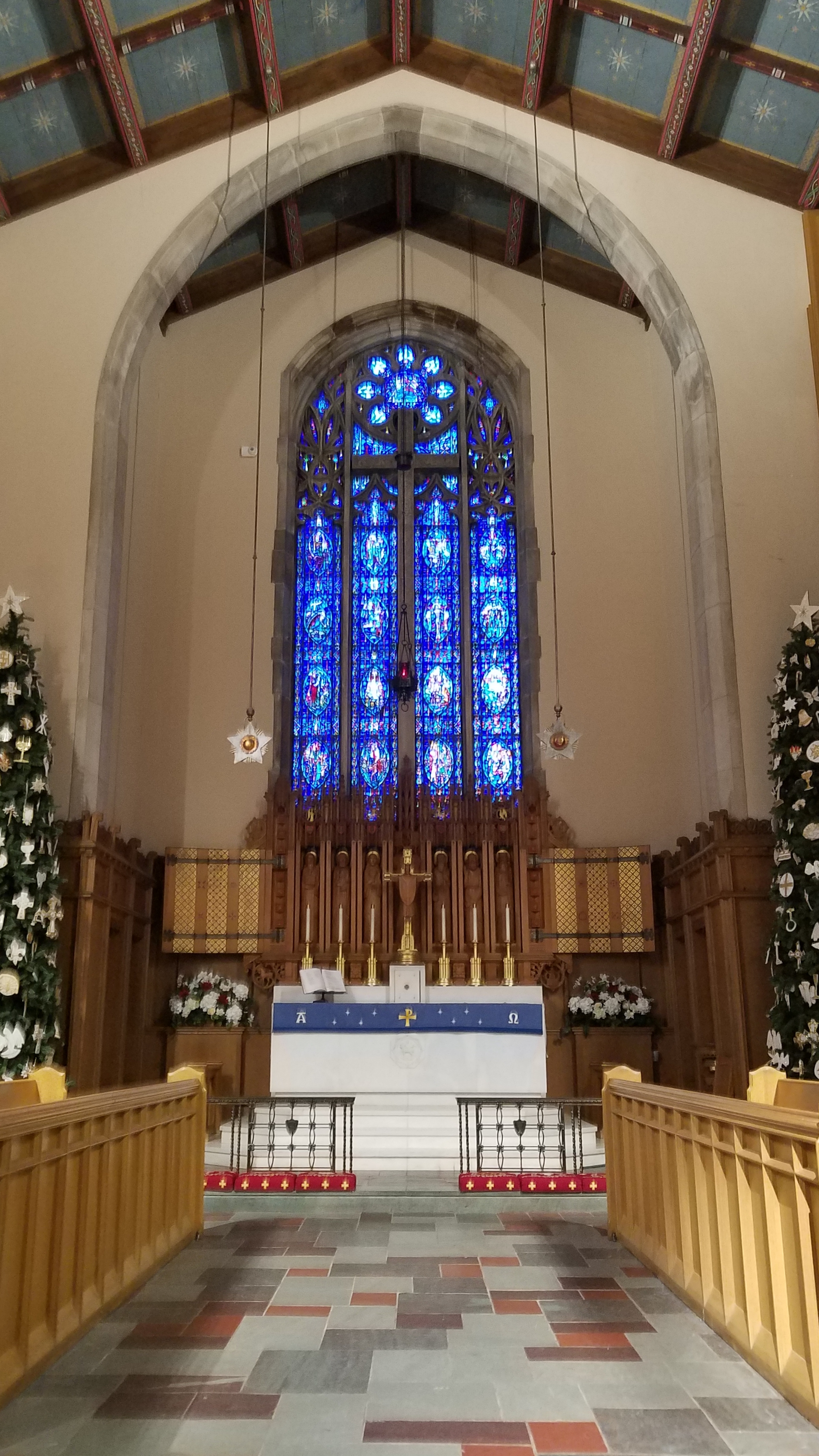
Lutheran Church of the Redeemer (High Church)

== See also ==
- Central churchmanship
- Liberal Anglo-Catholicism
- Conservative evangelicalism in Britain
- Homosexuality and the Anglican Communion
- Crypto-papism
- Crypto-Calvinism

== Bibliography ==
- Balleine, G. R. (1909). A History of the Evangelical Party. London: Longmans, Green & Co.
- Bebbington, D. W. (1993). Evangelicalism in Modern Britain. London: Routledge.
- Bennett, Gareth (1998). To the Church of England. Worthing, UK: Churchman Publishing Ltd.
- Chadwick, Owen (1996). The Reformation. London: Adam & Charles Black.
- Chadwick, Owen (1987). The Victorian Church (2 vol). London: Pelican.
- Cragg, Gerald C. The Church and the Age of Reason 1648–1789. London: Pelican (revised 1960).
- Davies, Julian (1992). The Caroline Captivity of the Church. Oxford: Clarendon Press.
- Hylson-Smith, Kenneth (1989). Evangelicals in the Church of England: 1734–1984. Edinburgh: T&T Clark.
- Shahan, Michael (2008). A Report from the Front Lines: Conversations on Public Theology: A Festschrift in Honor of Robert Benne. Wm. B. Eerdmans Publishing. ISBN 978-0-8028-4863-5.
- Smyth, Charles (1962). The Church and the Nation. London: Hodder & Stoughton.
- Rosman, Doreen (2006). The Evolution of the English Churches. Cambridge University Press.
- Spurr, John (1991). The Restoration, Church of England, 1646–1689. London: Yale University Press.
- Trevelyan, G. M. (December 1944). History of England. London: Longman Green & Co.
