= Housman (surname) =

Housman is a surname. Notable people with the surname include:

- A. E. Housman (1859–1936), English classical scholar and poet
- Arthur Housman (1889–1942), American actor
- Clemence Housman (1861–1955), English author, illustrator and activist in the women's suffrage movement
- David Housman (born 1946), American geneticist
- George Housman Thomas (1824–1868), English painter and illustrator
- Glen Housman (born 1971), Australian long-distance freestyle swimmer
- Laurence Housman (1865–1959), English playwright, writer and illustrator
- Rosalie Housman (1888–1949), American composer
- Walt Housman (born 1962), American football player

Fictional characters:

- Gary Housman, the fictional main character in the film Balls Out: Gary the Tennis Coach

== See also ==
- Houseman (disambiguation)
  - Houseman (surname)
- Hausmann
- Houtman
