= 16th Street NW =

Road in Washington, D.C.

16th Street Northwest
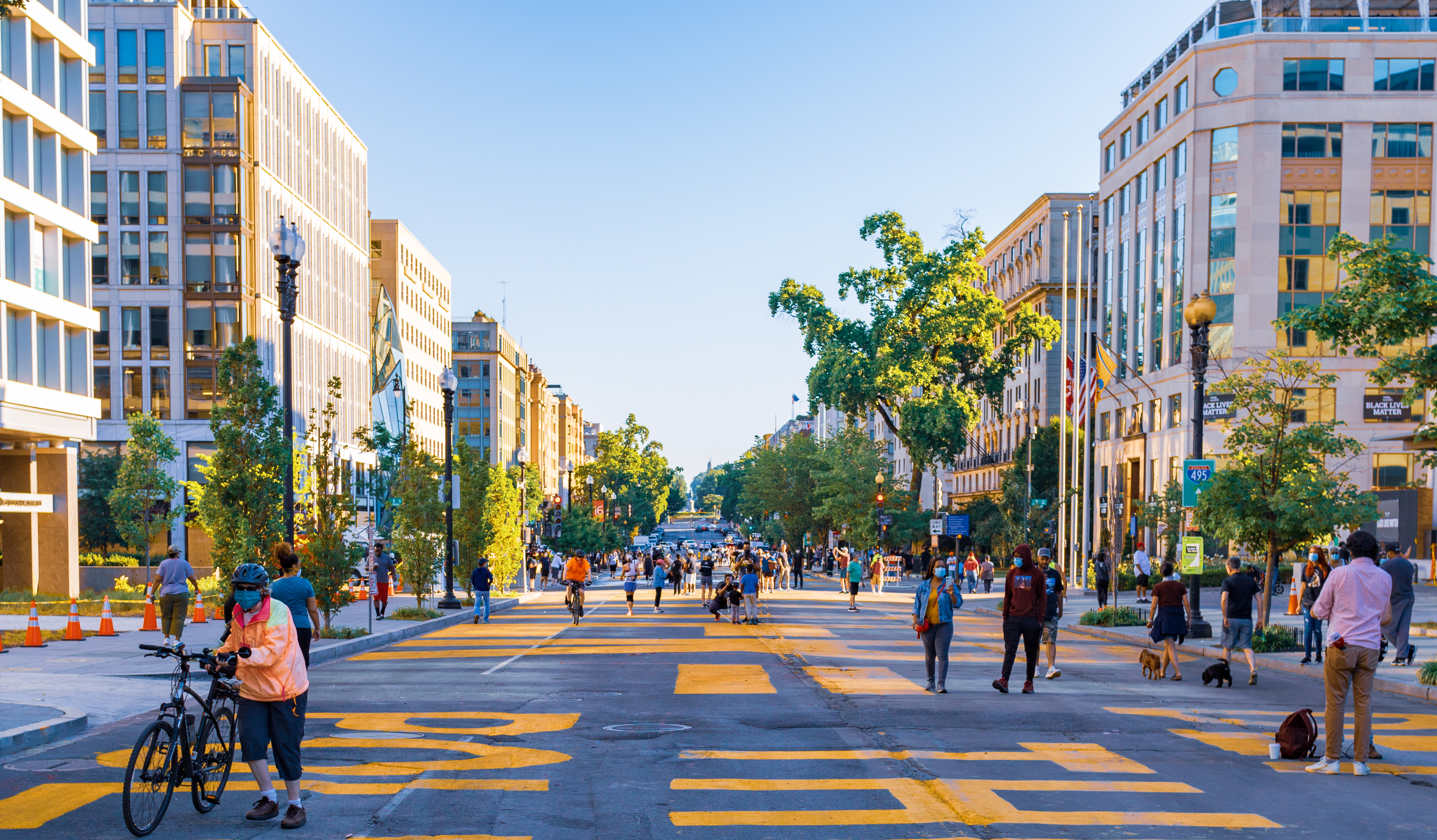
- Interactive map of 16th Street Northwest
- Maintained by: DDOT
- Length: 6.4 mi (10.3 km)
- Location: Northwest, Washington, D.C.
- South end: H Street at Lafayette Park
- Major junctions: K Street; Scott Circle
- North end: Georgia Ave in Silver Spring
- East: 15th Street
- West: 17th Street

Construction
- Commissioned: 1791

16th Street Northwest, briefly known as the Avenue of the Presidents, is a prominent north-south boulevard in Washington, D.C., located in Northwest D.C. The street was laid out as part of the 1791 L'Enfant Plan, which served as the original blueprint for the city. The street begins just north of the White House, across from Lafayette Square in the President's Park, and continues north along the Washington meridian until Blair Circle.

The street passes through several notable landmarks and thoroughfares, including K Street, Scott Circle, Meridian Hill Park, Rock Creek Park before crossing Eastern Avenue into Silver Spring, Maryland, where it ends at Georgia Avenue. From K Street to the District line, it is part of the National Highway System, while the Maryland portion is designated Maryland Route 390. The entire street is 6.4 miles (10.3 km) long. Part of the street is listed on the National Register of Historic Places as Sixteenth Street Historic District. From June 2020 to March 2025, the section immediately north of the White House was known officially as Black Lives Matter Plaza, featuring a large-scale mural of the wordmark on the street.

== History ==
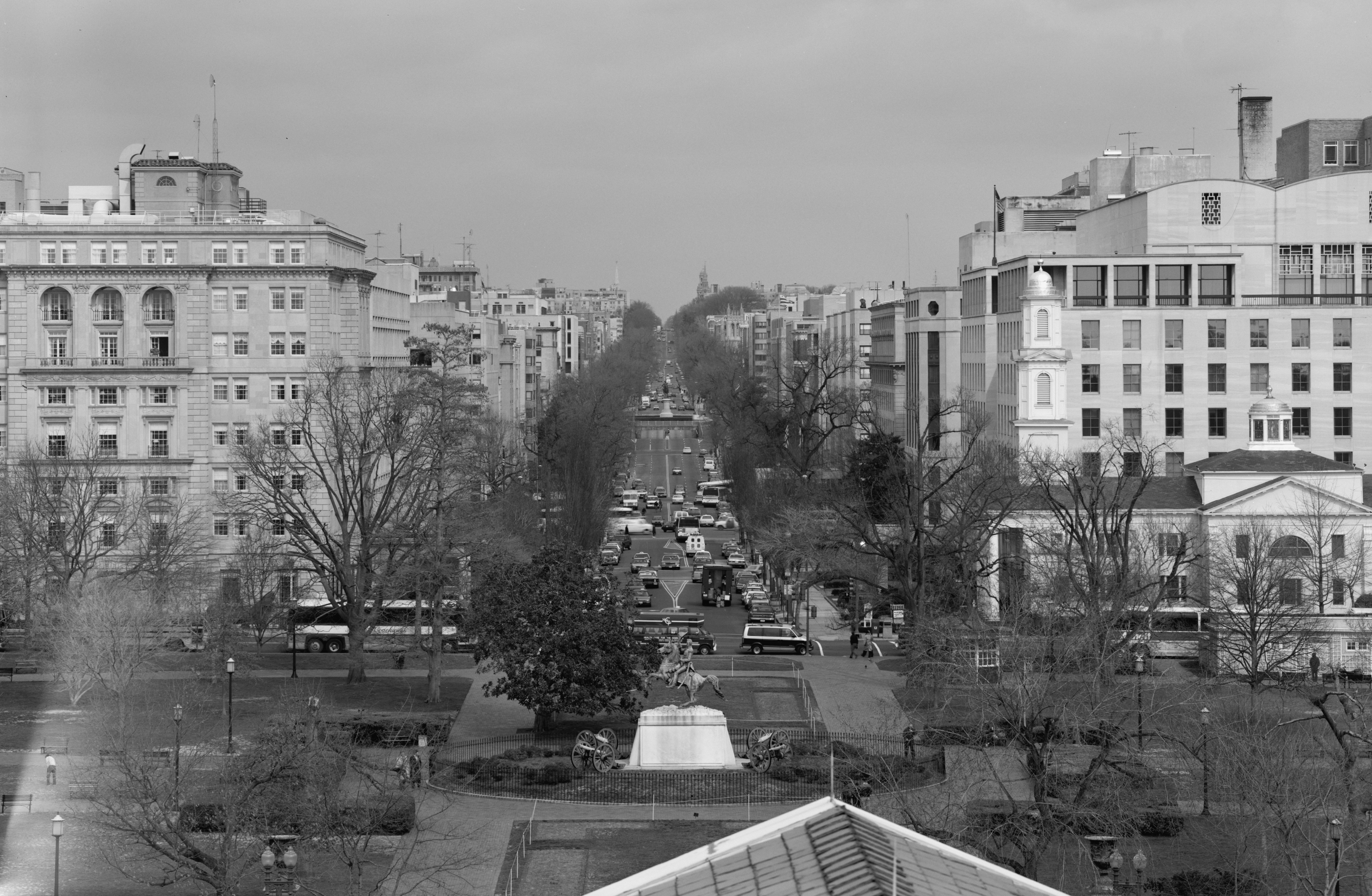
Northward view of 16th Street from the White House in 1976

16th Street was developed by Pierre Charles L'Enfant as part of the 1791 L'Enfant Plan, the foundational urban plan of Washington.

=== World War I Memorial Trees ===
In 1920, more than 500 trees were planted along 16th Street between Alaska Avenue and Varnum Street to honor fallen soldiers from World War I. Today, the 16th Street World War I Memorial Trees and their corresponding markers have largely been lost to history.

=== Ronald Reagan Boulevard 2005 proposal ===
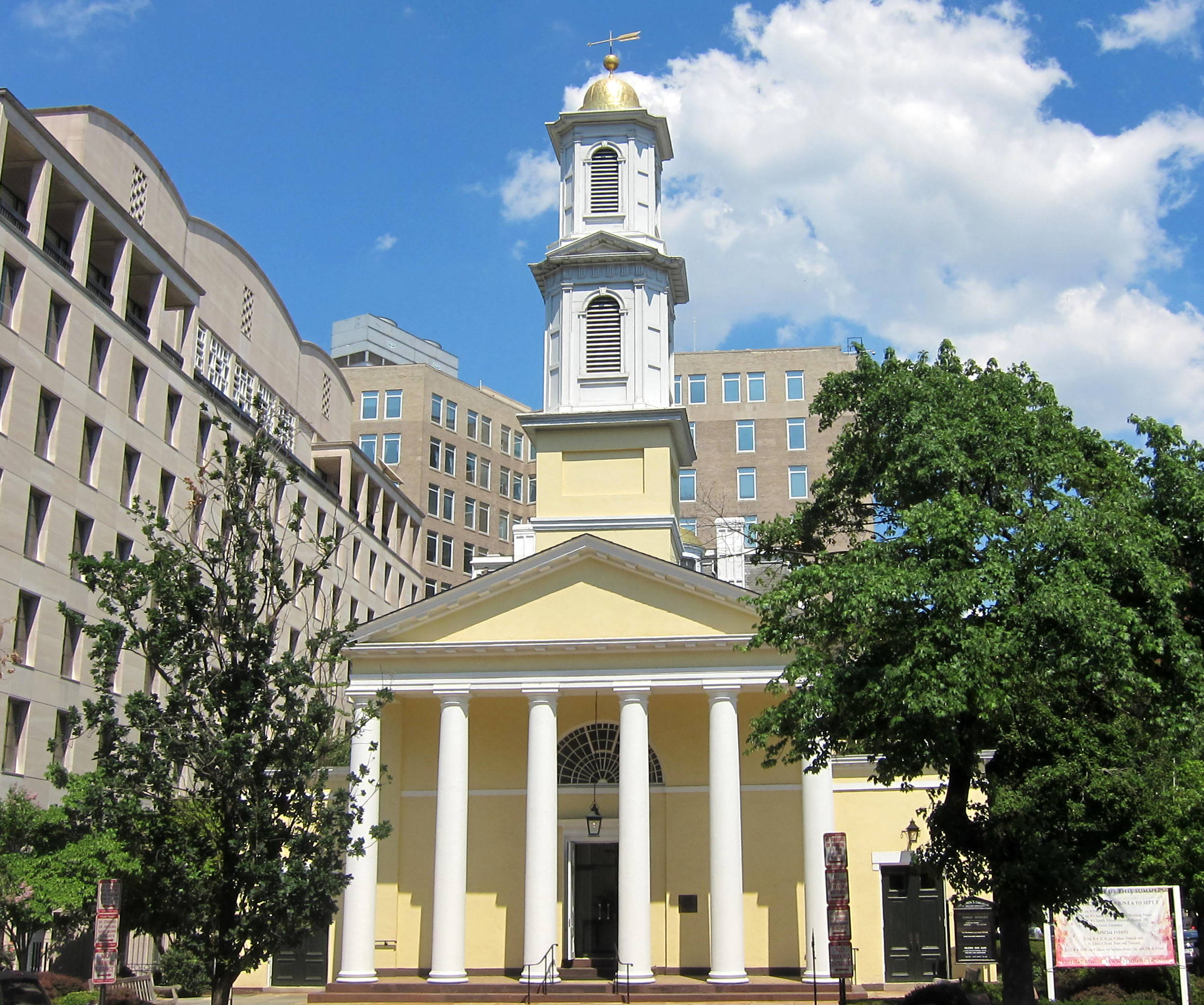
St. John's Church, known as the "Church of the Presidents", has been attended by every single U.S. President since it was built in 1816, starting with James Madison.

In July 2005, just before Congress's summer recess, Texas Republican congressman Henry Bonilla quietly introduced resolution H.R. 3525 to rename 16th Street NW "Ronald Reagan Boulevard" in honor of the former president of the United States. Mayor Anthony A. Williams objected on the grounds that the proposal would have changed Pierre L'Enfant's 1791 design for the city and cost an estimated $1 million for new signs and maps. The plan was ultimately quashed by Rep. Tom Davis, chairman of the House Government Reform Committee and a fellow Republican representing Washington's Virginia suburbs.

=== Black Lives Matter Plaza renaming ===
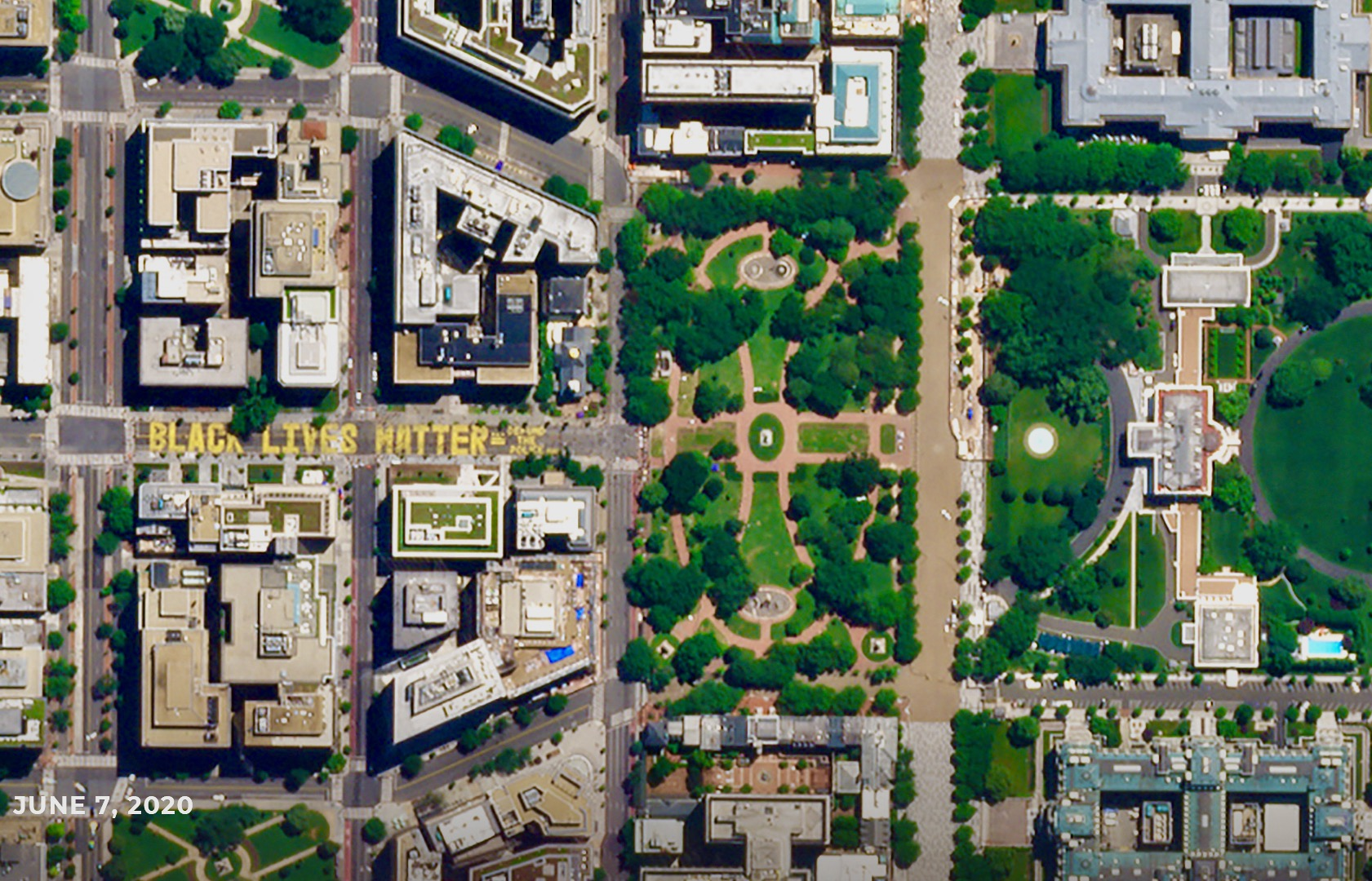
Black Lives Matter Plaza yellow lettering seen from space in 2020.

On June 5, 2020, during the George Floyd protests in Washington, D.C., the city's Department of Public Works painted the words "Black Lives Matter" in 35-foot yellow capital letters on 16th Street NW near the White House and Lafayette Square, with the help of the department's MuralsDC program. The D.C. flag accompanied the text. Later that day, Mayor Muriel Bowser announced that part of the street had been ceremonially renamed Black Lives Matter Plaza.

On June 6, 2020, activists altered the mural. They removed the stars from the D.C. flag, changing it to an equals sign, and added the words "defund the police" so that the mural read "Black Lives Matter = Defund the Police". The plaza was removed in March 2025.

== Significance ==
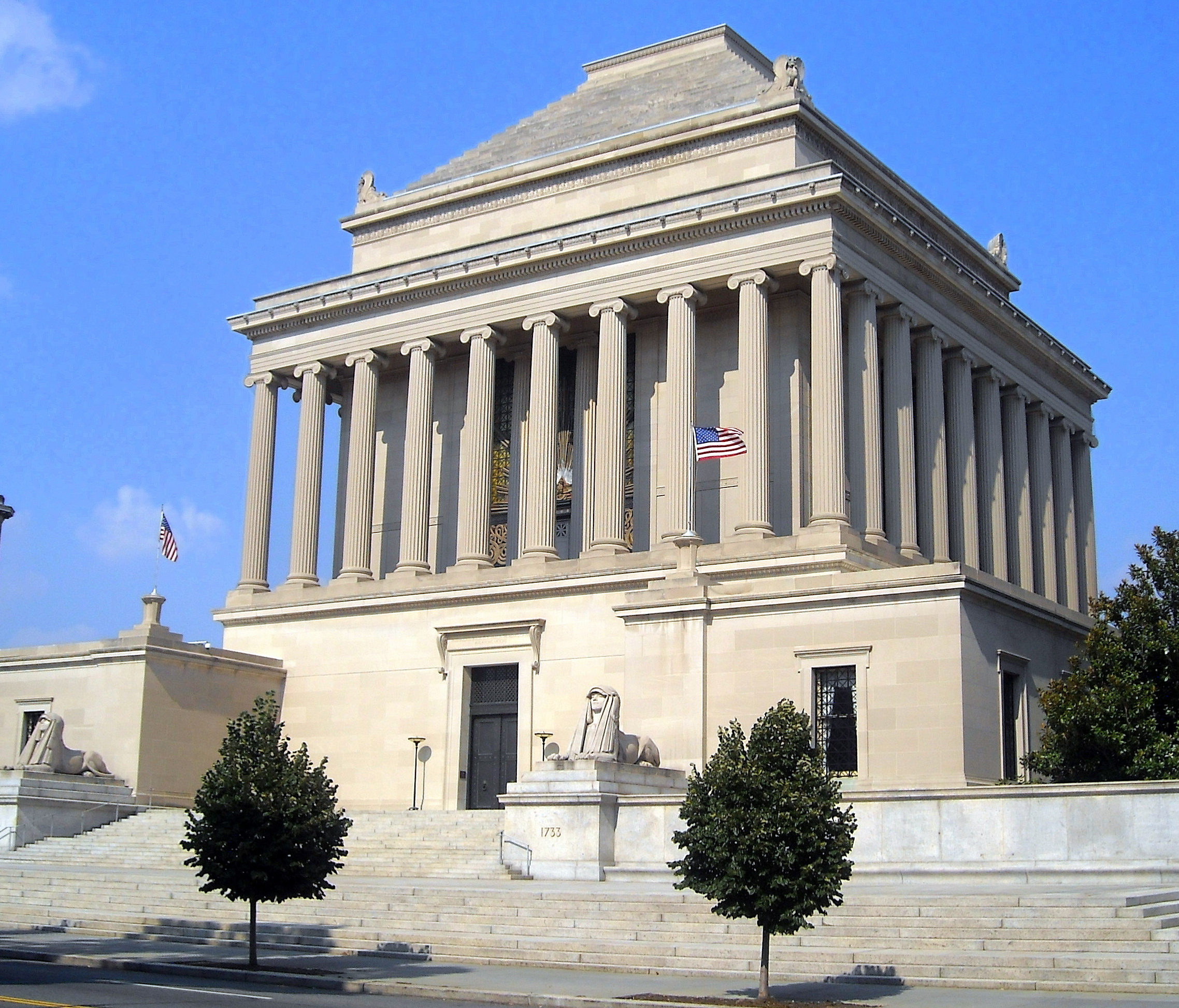
House of the Temple

Early in the city's history, many foreign countries opened their embassies on 16th Street because of its proximity to the White House. Many religious denominations followed with churches, earning the street the nickname "Church Row." These include Foundry Methodist (attended by Presidents Hayes and Clinton), First Baptist (attended by Presidents Truman and Carter), the Nineteenth Street Baptist Church which was originally named the First Colored Baptist Church of Washington, D.C. (visited twice by President Barack Obama), St. John's ("Church of the Presidents"), All Souls Unitarian, Universalist National Memorial Church, St. John the Baptist Russian Orthodox Cathedral, founded in 1949 and built in 1958, and Third Church of Christ, Scientist, which was designed by an associate of I.M. Pei in 1971 and demolished in 2014. Shrine of the Sacred Heart is located just off of 16th Street. After most of the embassies moved to Embassy Row and other parts of the city, the churches became more prominent in 16th Street's identity. Other notable buildings include the Scottish Rite Masons' House of the Temple, Carnegie Institution for Science, Robert Simpson Woodward House, the Warder Mansion, Carter Barron Amphitheater, the Washington, D.C. Jewish Community Center, and the Toutorsky Mansion.

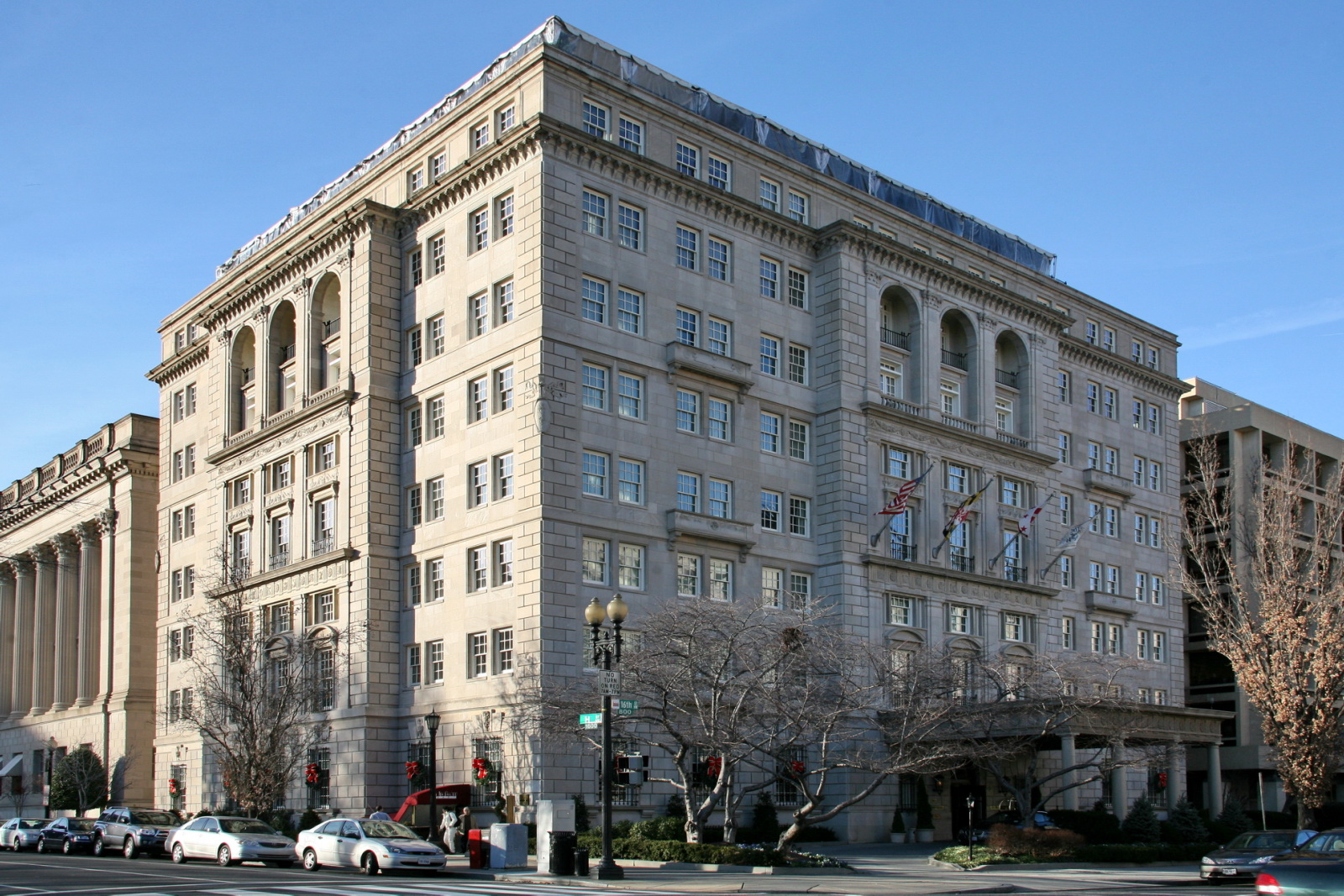
The Hay–Adams Hotel, built 1928

The AFL–CIO, American Trucking Association, National Education Association, American Chemical Society, National Geographic Society, and Benjamin Franklin University have prominent buildings on 16th Street. The National Rifle Association of America was headquartered on the street until the late 1990s.

By the end of the 19th century, 16th Street NW stretched some 2.5 miles from the White House north to Morris Road NW (now Monroe Street NW). On March 30, 1899, the United States Congress authorized the extension of the street to the D.C.-Maryland line. Within two years, the city completed condemnation proceedings to obtain the necessary land. But bridging the natural obstacle of the Piney Branch valley—with the nation's first parabolic arch bridge—would take until 1909.

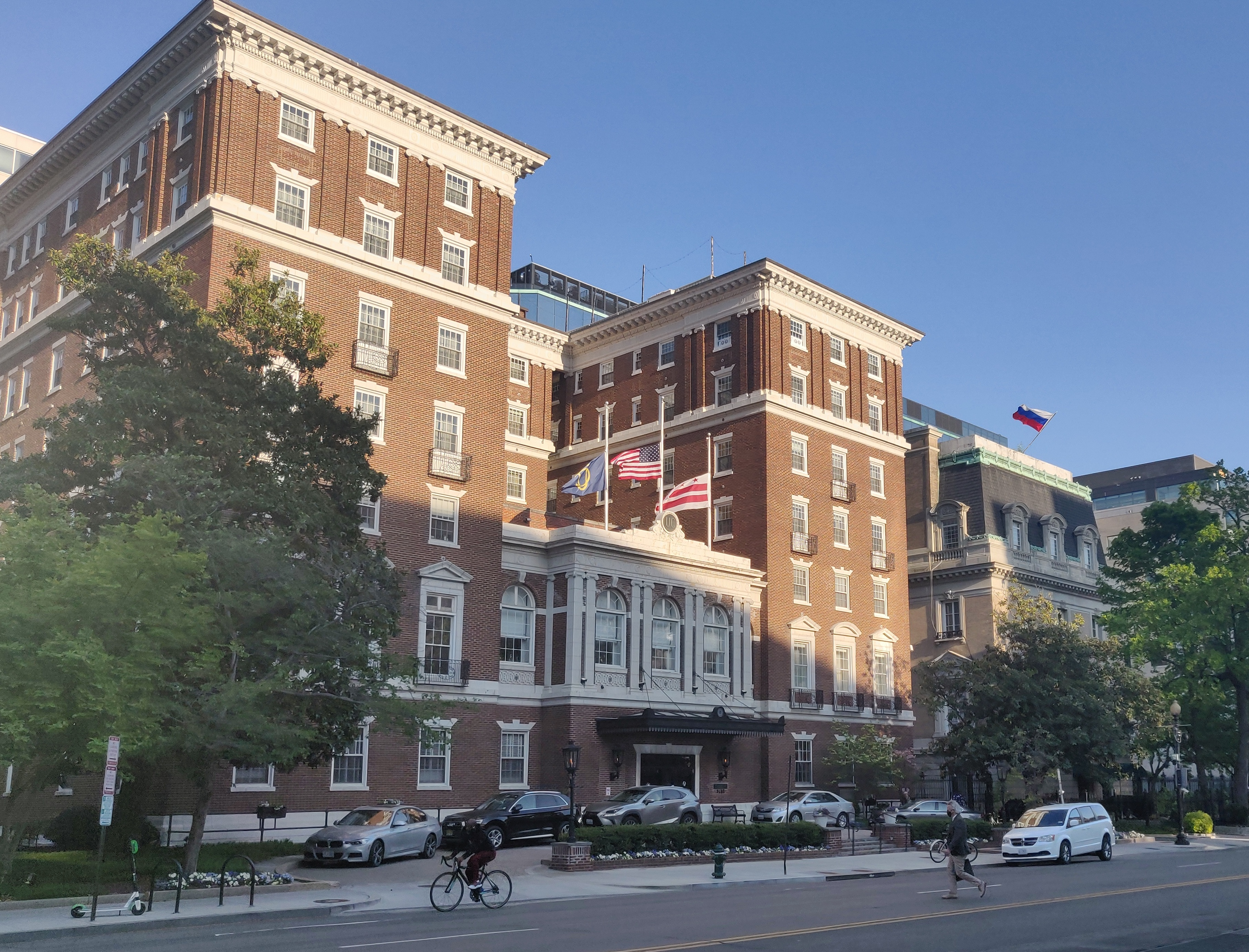
University Club (left), built in 1904, and the Russian Ambassador's residence (right), built in 1910.

The northern and central portions of 16th Street—and the Crestwood neighborhood, in particular—have for a half century been the chosen neighborhood of accomplished African Americans in Washington. Known colloquially as "The Gold Coast", these sections of 16th Street are lined with early 20th-century Tudor mansions. As 16th Street continues north through the Shepherd Park neighborhood, the street passes 7700 16th Street NW, a Tudor-style house that was the scene of a notorious crime; several houses of worship, including the Ohev Sholom synagogue and historic Tiffereth Israel synagogue, across the street from one another; and the Washington Ethical Society.

The street's proximity to Rock Creek Park and importance as a thoroughfare has made it a natural dividing boundary for Washington neighborhoods. Outside of the downtown area, no neighborhood in the city falls on both sides of 16th Street; the neighborhoods that surround it have 16th as either their eastern or their western boundary. For many years, the wide street was the de facto "boundary" between Caucasian and African-American neighborhoods of the city, especially in the tense years after the 1968 race riots.

A pair of similarly named streets, 16th Street Northeast and 16th Street Southeast, are three miles (5 km) away in the northeast and southeast quadrants of Washington. They are contiguous with each other and parallel to 16th Street NW. There is no 16th Street Southwest, as this space is occupied by the National Mall and the Washington Channel.
