= Beckers =

Beckers is an occupational surname, especially common in both Dutch and Belgian Limburg and the neighboring part of Germany. It is equivalent to the English Baker, Dutch Bakker and Backer, and German Becker.

== Geographical distribution ==
As of 2014, 38.8% of all known bearers of the surname Beckers were residents of Germany (frequency 1:8,918), 29.7% of Belgium (1:1,669), 22.0% of the Netherlands (1:3,308), 3.9% of the United States (1:401,837) and 1.1% of France (1:252,880).

In Belgium, the frequency of the surname was higher than national average (1:1,669) only in one region:

1. Flemish Region (1:1,492)

In the Netherlands, the frequency of the surname was higher than national average (1:3,308) only in one province:

1. Limburg (1:379)

In Germany, the frequency of the surname was higher than national average (1:8,918) only in one state:

1. North Rhine-Westphalia (1:2,328)

== People ==
- Betty Beckers (1925–1982), French actress
- Christine Beckers (b. 1943), Belgian racing driver
- Hubert Beckers (1806–1889), German philosopher
- Jacques Beckers (1934–2021), Dutch-born American astrophysicist
- Jürgen Beckers (b. 1964), German cabaret performer and comedian
- Marc Beckers (b. 1973), German footballer
- Paul Beckers (1878–1965), German actor
- fr:Pierre Beckers (1885–1968), Belgian politician
- Pierre-Olivier Beckers (b. 1960), Belgian businessman
- Ria Beckers (1938–2006), Dutch Green politician

== See also ==
- Becker, a common German surname
- Paige Bueckers (born 2001), American basketball player whose surname is pronounced "Beckers"
