= Timeline of Washington, D.C. =

Major events in the history of the city of Washington, District of Columbia

The following is a timeline of the history of Washington, D.C., the capital city of the United States.

== 17th century ==
- 1632: First description of the land at Washington written in his journals by Henry Fleete.

== 18th century ==
- 1751: Georgetown founded
- 1752 – February: First survey of Georgetown completed.
- 1784 – October 7: Elbridge Gerry of Massachusetts motions “that buildings for the use of Congress be erected on the banks of the Delaware near Trenton, or of the Potomac, near Georgetown, provided a suitable district can be procured on one of the rivers as aforesaid, for a federal town”.
- 1789 – Town of Georgetown, Maryland, chartered and incorporated; Georgetown University founded.
- 1790 – July 16: Residence Act enacted, selecting a site along the Potomac River as the future location of the permanent seat of the federal government of the United States.
- 1791
  - January 24: Federal District proclamation issued by President George Washington.
  - Team led by Andrew Ellicott begins survey of the future boundaries of the original District of Columbia.
  - L'Enfant Plan for design of the City of Washington introduced.
  - September 9: Commissioners appointed by President Washington name the federal district as "The Territory of Columbia," and the federal city as the "City of Washington."
- 1792 – Construction of White House (presidential residence) begins.
- 1794 – Tudor Place (residence) built in Georgetown.
- 1797 – "Bridge at Little Falls" crossing the upper Potomac River several miles northwest of Georgetown, opens at the future site of 19th century Chain Bridge.
- 1800
  - May 14 – November 1: Seat of Federal government of the United States relocated after ten years from second federal capital of Philadelphia (centered at Independence Hall (old Pennsylvania State House) to constitutionally designated ten mile square federal district entitled District of Columbia (on both sides of Potomac River). Originally called the "Federal City", it soon acquires namesake after President Washington, (especially after his recent death a few months earlier at nearby Mount Vernon in December 1799), known in 19th century as Washington city.
  - Second President John Adams travels south from former second national capital at Philadelphia and is the first chief executive to occupy the President's House (future White House) in November with his wife Abigail to the unfinished mansion. The Adamses occupy the house for only the last four months of his term, having been defeated for reelection by incumbent Vice President Thomas Jefferson in the Election of 1800 until Jefferson's inauguration the following year on March 4, 1801.
  - United States Capitol building construction continues with partial completion of the north Senate wing where the United States Congress meets for its first sessions in Washington. Construction continues on south House of Representatives south wing. The Senate wing, completed first temporarily provides spaces to be used by both houses of the Congress, the beginnings of the Library of Congress and the Supreme Court for several years of continued construction work.
  - Washington Navy Yard established on the Eastern Branch (later known as Anacostia River) of the Potomac River waterfront south of the under-construction Capitol.
  - Population: 14,093.

== 19th century ==
=== 1800s–1850s ===
- 1801
  - February 24: US Congress establishes the District of Columbia (comprising Washington County, Alexandria, and Alexandria County).
  - March 4: US president Jefferson inaugurated.
- 1802
  - "City of Washington" incorporated; mayor-council government established.
  - Jail built.
- 1806 – Public school opens.
- 1809 – May 20: Long Bridge crossing the Potomac River near 14th Street SW opens.
- 1814 – August 24: Burning of Washington by British forces.
- 1815 – Washington City Canal begins operating.
- 1816 – St. John's Episcopal Church, Lafayette Square built.
- 1818 – Central heating system installed in the U.S. Capitol building.
- 1835
  - Baltimore and Ohio Railroad begins operating.
  - Labor strike by federal navy yard workers.
- 1836 – December 15: 1836 U.S. Patent Office fire.
- 1840 – Population: 23,364 in city; 43,712 in district.
- 1842 – United States Naval Observatory established.
- 1844 – Baltimore-Washington telegraph begins operating.
- 1846
  - District of Columbia retrocession of Alexandria and Alexandria County to Virginia.
  - National Smithsonian Institution established.
- 1848
  - Cornerstone of the Washington Monument placed.
  - Washington Gas Light Company established.
- 1850
  - District of Columbia's stone for the Washington Monument dedicated.
  - Congress abolishes slave trade in the District of Columbia.
- 1851 – University of the District of Columbia founded (formerly known as Miner Normal School).
- 1855 – Smithsonian Institution Building (The Castle) completed.

=== 1860s–1890s ===
- 1860 – Population: 61,122.
- 1862 – Slavery abolished. Congress requires city to provide schooling for black students.
- 1863 – National Academy of Sciences headquartered in city.
- 1864 – July: Battle of Fort Stevens.
- 1865
  - April 14: Assassination of president Lincoln.
  - first black school opens at 2nd and C, SE
- 1867
  - Howard University founded.
  - "Blacks given right of suffrage."
- 1869
  - National Convention of the Colored Men of America held in city.
  - American Equal Rights Association meets in city.
- 1870
  - Children's Hospital established.
  - Population: 109,199.
- 1871
  - District of Columbia Organic Act of 1871 effected.
  - Norton P. Chipman becomes delegate to the US House of Representatives from the District of Columbia.
- 1877 – Washington Post newspaper begins publication.
- 1878 – Telephone begins operating.
- 1880 – Population: 147,293 in city; 177,624 in district.
- 1881
  - February: Flood.
  - "Tiber Canal filled in to become Constitution Avenue."
  - American National Red Cross headquartered in city.
  - July 2: Assassination of James A. Garfield; he would die two months of complications in Elberon, New Jersey
- 1884 – International Meridian Conference
- 1885 – Washington Monument dedicated.
- 1888 – Electric streetcar begins operating.
- 1889
  - National Zoo opens.
  - Lincoln Music Hall (later Academy of Music) opens with a performance by the Boston Symphony Orchestra on December 20.
- 1890
  - Rock Creek Park established.
  - Population: 230,392.
- 1893 – American University founded.
- 1897 – American Negro Academy founded.
- 1899 – Height of Buildings Act of 1899 legislated.
- 1900 – Population: 278,718.

== 20th century ==
=== 1900s–1940s ===
- 1902 – McMillan Plan for design of city introduced.
- 1906 – District Building (city hall) constructed.
- 1907
  - Union Station built.
  - Washington National Cathedral construction begins.
- 1910 – Population: 331,069.
- 1912 – "Cherry trees planted around the Tidal Basin."
- 1913
- 1915 – Association for the Study of Negro Life and History established.
- 1917 – National Sylvan Theater opens.
- 1919 – July: Racial unrest.
- 1920
  - Population: 437,571.
  - Dedication of the 16th Street World War I Memorial Trees
- 1922
  - January 28: Storm crushes Knickerbocker Theatre.
  - May 30: Lincoln Memorial dedicated.
- 1923 – Smithsonian's Freer Gallery of Art opens.
- 1924
  - National Capital Park Commission established.
  - Washington Senators baseball team wins 1924 World Series.
- 1925
  - WMAL radio begins broadcasting.
  - Ku Klux Klan marches on Pennsylvania Ave.
- 1926 – Federal Triangle construction begins.
- 1930 – Population: 486,869.
- 1931 – National Symphony Orchestra formed.
- 1932
  - May: "Bonus Army" demonstration.
  - Arlington Memorial Bridge opens.
  - Folger Shakespeare Library built.
- 1935 – National Cherry Blossom Festival begins.
- 1937 – Washington Redskins football team active.
- 1940 – Population: 663,091.
- 1941
  - National Airport built.
  - National Gallery of Art opens.
- 1942 – Declaration by United Nations signed in city.
- 1944 – International Dumbarton Oaks Conference held in city.
- 1946 – International Monetary Fund headquartered in city.
- 1947 – WMAL-TV, WRC-TV, and WTTG (television) begin broadcasting.
- 1949
  - Whitehurst Freeway begins operating.
  - WTOP-TV (television) begins broadcasting.

=== 1950s–1990s ===
- 1950 – Population: 802,178.
- 1953 – January 15: 1953 Pennsylvania Railroad train wreck.
- 1954
  - March 1: United States Capitol shooting incident (1954).
  - Bolling v. Sharpe decided, schools integrated in 54–55 school year
- 1957 – May 17: National Prayer Pilgrimage for Freedom civil rights demonstration takes place in D.C.
- 1959 – International Antarctic Treaty signed in city.
- 1960
  - Treaty of Mutual Cooperation and Security between the United States and Japan signed in city.
  - Population: 763,956.
- 1962 – Streetcar stops operating.
- 1963 – August 28: March on Washington for Jobs and Freedom; Martin Luther King Jr. gives "I Have a Dream" speech.
- 1964
  - November: "D.C. residents are able to vote for president for the first time."
  - Capital Beltway constructed.
- 1965
  - April 17: March Against the Vietnam War.
  - Washingtonian magazine begins publication.
- 1967
  - Mayor-council form of government implemented; Walter Washington becomes mayor.
  - Smithsonian Folklife Festival begins.
  - Biograph cinema opens.
- 1968
  - April: 1968 Washington, D.C. riots occur.
  - American Association of Retired Persons headquartered in city (approximate date).
- 1969
  - November 15: Protest against Vietnam War.
  - Gay Blade newspaper begins publication.
  - Key Theatre in business.
- 1970 – Population: 756,510.
- 1971
  - April: Antiwar protest.
  - May: 1971 May Day protests against war.
  - June 30: New York Times Co. v. United States decided; allows Washington Post to publish Pentagon Papers about Vietnam.
  - Walter E. Fauntroy becomes delegate to the US House of Representatives from the District of Columbia.
  - National Kennedy Center for the Performing Arts opens.
  - Center for Science in the Public Interest headquartered in city.
- 1972 – Watergate scandal discovered.
- 1973 – Mayoral election established, per US Congress' District of Columbia Home Rule Act.
- 1974
  - 1974 White House helicopter incident
  - Smithsonian's Hirshhorn Museum opens.
- 1976
  - March: Washington Metro begins operating.
  - May: Concorde supersonic airplane begins operating.
  - US Bicentennial held.
- 1979
  - Marion Barry becomes mayor.
  - C-SPAN begins televising federal government proceedings.
- 1980 – Western Plaza (later renamed to "Freedom Plaza") containing a raised marble inlay depicting parts of the L'Enfant Plan for the city of Washington opens along Pennsylvania Avenue N.W. between the White House and the United States Capitol.
- 1981
  - March 30: Attempted assassination of president Reagan.
  - Washington City Paper begins publication.
- 1982
  - January 13: Crash of Air Florida Flight 90.
  - Washington Convention Center built.
  - National Vietnam Veterans Memorial erected.
  - Washington Times newspaper begins publication.
- 1983 – 1983 U.S. Senate bombing
- 1985
  - Federal News Service in business.
  - National Building Museum opens
  - Washington Printmakers Gallery opens.
- 1987
  - Smithsonian's Sackler Gallery and National Museum of African Art open.
  - Dupont Circle 5 cinema in business.
- 1990
  - Population: 606,900.
  - October 27: Mayor Marion Barry receives six-month prison sentence for cocaine possession.
  - November 6: Sharon Pratt Dixon wins mayoral election.
- 1991
  - Eleanor Holmes Norton becomes delegate to the US House of Representatives from the District of Columbia.
  - City bicentennial.
- 1993
  - United States Holocaust Memorial Museum opens
  - National Postal Museum opens
- 1994 – November 8: Marion Barry wins mayoral election.
- 1995
  - April 17: President William J. Clinton signs the District of Columbia Financial Responsibility and Management Assistance Act of 1995, establishing the District of Columbia Financial Control Board.
  - October 16: National Million Man March held in city.
- 1996 – City website online (approximate date).
- 1997 – July 7: Starbucks triple homicide in Georgetown
- 1998 – United States Capitol shooting incident
- 1999 – Anthony A. Williams becomes mayor.
- 2000 – May 14: Million Mom March held.

== 21st century ==
- 2001 – September: 2001 anthrax attacks
- 2002 – International Spy Museum
- 2003 – Washington Convention Center rebuilt.
- 2007 – Adrian Fenty became mayor.
- 2008
  - Nationals Park opens.
  - Newseum opens in D.C.
- 2009
  - January 20: Inauguration of U.S. president Obama
  - Night at the Museum: Battle of the Smithsonian is released, taking place in D.C.
  - The District survived Snowmageddon
- 2010 – Population: 601,723
- 2011
  - Vincent C. Gray became mayor.
  - CityCenterDC construction began.
- 2014 – Initiative 71 approved by voters, leading to the legalization of cannabis
- 2015 – Muriel Bowser became mayor.
- 2016
  - January 2016 United States winter storm
  - DC Streetcar began operation.
  - March–April: 2016 Nuclear Security Summit
  - National Museum of African American History and Culture opens to the public.
  - District of Columbia statehood referendum, 2016
- 2017
  - January 20: Inauguration of U.S. President Donald Trump
  - January 21: National Women's March on Washington scheduled
- 2018 – The Washington Capitals won their first Stanley Cup in franchise history.
- 2019 – The Washington Nationals won the World Series.
- 2020 – The coronavirus disease 2019 caused the District to lock down for the first time in history.
- 2021
  - January 6: Storming of the United States Capitol
  - January 20: Inauguration of U.S. President Joe Biden
  - April 2: Vehicle-ramming attack outside the United States Capitol
- 2022
  - March: 2022 Northeastern U.S. serial shooter
  - April 22: Self-immolation of Wynn Bruce
  - September United States–Pacific Island Country Summit held
  - November: Initiative 82 approved
  - December United States–Africa Leaders Summit 2022 held
- 2023
- 2024
- 2025
  - January 9: Funeral of Jimmy Carter
  - January 20: Second inauguration of Donald Trump
  - January 29: 2025 Potomac River mid-air collision
  - March: Black Lives Matter Plaza removed
  - March: Congress passes continuing resolution with provision to allow D.C. to continue spending under its 2025 budget omitted causing a projected $1 billion shortfall to D.C.'s budget
  - May: Capital Jewish Museum shooting
  - June: Military parade
  - August: Law enforcement intervention
  - September: Best Friends Forever (sculpture)
  - November 12: 2026 Logan Circle shooting - A 55-year-old doctor opened fire inside and from the window of his condo, killing his landlord and shooting six people at random. He then killed himself during a stand-off with officers that lead to him firing several rounds at them, though missing them.

== See also ==
- History of Washington, D.C.
- List of mayors of Washington, D.C.
- Category:African-American history of Washington, D.C.
- National Register of Historic Places listings in Washington, D.C.
- List of National Historic Landmarks in Washington, D.C.
- List of United States Congresses
- List of US presidential inaugural ceremonies
- Timeline of Alexandria, Virginia
- List of rallies and protest marches in Washington, D.C.
- Architecture of Washington, D.C.
- List of incidents of political violence in Washington, D.C.
- List of protests in the United States

== Bibliography ==
- Hunter, Alfred, ed. (1853). Washington and Georgetown Directory. Washington DC: Printed by Kirkwood & McGill. OCLC 6175971 – via HathiTrust.
- Boyd, Andrew, ed. (1860). Boyd's Washington and Georgetown Directory. Washington DC: Taylor and Maury – via Internet Archive.
  - 1864
- Overall, William Henry, ed. (1870), "Washington", Dictionary of Chronology, London: William Tegg, hdl:2027/uc2.ark:/13960/t9m32q949, OCLC 2613202 – via HathiTrust
- Townsend, George Henry (1877), "Washington", A Manual of Dates (5th ed.), London: Frederick Warne & Co., hdl:2027/hvd.32044088047865
- Boyd, Elizabeth S.; Boyd, Andrew; Boyd, William Henry (1887). Boyd's Directory for the District of Columbia. Washington DC: Wm. H. Boyd. hdl:2027/mdp.39015074642748.
- Gannett, Henry (1888). "Washington (1.)" . Encyclopædia Britannica. Vol. 24 (9th ed.).
- Bryan, Wilhelmus Bogart (1900). Bibliography of the District of Columbia. Washington: Government Printing Office.
  - 1901
- Harvey, Frederick L. (1902). History of the Washington National Monument and Washington National Monument Society. Washington, D.C.: Norman K Elliott Printing Co. OCLC 4909191 – via Google Books.
  - 1903
- Bryan, Wilhelmus Bogart (1900). Bibliography of the District of Columbia. Washington: Government Printing Office.
- Boyd, Elizabeth S.; Boyd, Andrew; Boyd, William Henry (1909). Boyd's Directory for the District of Columbia. Washington DC: R.L. Polk & Co. hdl:2027/mdp.39015006986833.
- "Washington (District of Columbia)" . Encyclopædia Britannica. Vol. 28 (11th ed.). 1911. pp. 349–352.
- Vincent, Benjamin (1910), "Washington", Haydn's Dictionary of Dates (25th ed.), London: Ward, Lock & Co., hdl:2027/uc2.ark:/13960/t41r6xh8t
- Proctor, John Clagett (1922). "Washington (District of Columbia)" . Encyclopædia Britannica. Vol. 32 (12th ed.).
- Federal Writers' Project (1937), "Chronology", Washington, City and Capital, American Guide Series, U.S. Govt. print. off., hdl:2027/mdp.39015007194775
- Reeves, Thomas C. (February 1975). Gentleman Boss. New York, NY: Alfred A. Knopf. ISBN 978-0-394-46095-6.
- Howard Furer (1975). Washington, a chronological & documentary history, 1790-1970. American Cities Chronology Series. Oceana Publications. ISBN 0379006111.
- Alan Lessoff (2000). "Washington, D.C". In Finkelman, Paul (ed.). Encyclopedia of the United States in the Nineteenth Century. Charles Scribner's Sons. ISBN 0684805006.
- Goldfield, David, ed. (2007). "Washington, D.C". Encyclopedia of American Urban History. Sage. ISBN 978-1-4522-6553-7.
- Evelyn, Douglas E.; Dickson, Paul (2008). "Historical Timeline of Washington DC". On this Spot: Pinpointing the Past in Washington (3rd ed.). Capital Books. pp. 8–12. ISBN 978-1-933102-70-2.
- "Washington, DC Timeline and Historic Plans: Illustrating the Evolution of the 'Monumental Core' of the Nation's Capital" (PDF). US National Park Service. 2008.
