= Houseman =

Houseman may refer to:

- Houseman (surname)
- Houseman Field, a multi-purpose stadium in Grand Rapids, Michigan
- House officer (disambiguation), a junior doctor in a British or Irish hospital
- Useful man, a grade of domestic worker below footman

== See also ==
- Hausmann, a surname
- Housman (surname)
