= Houtman =

Houtman or De Houtman is a Dutch surname. Translating as "(the) woodman", the origin of the name may be toponymic ("from the woods") or occupational (lumberman, carpenter, etc.). Notable people with the surname include:

- Cornelis de Houtman (1565–1599), Dutch explorer who discovered a new sea route from Europe to Indonesia
- Frederick de Houtman (1571–1627), Dutch explorer who sailed along the Western coast of Australia to Batavia
- Jan Houtman (1917–1944), Dutch resistance member murdered during World War II
- Marques Houtman (born 1979), Cape Verdean American basketball point guard
- Peter Houtman (born 1957), Dutch football striker
- Rinus Houtman (born 1942), Dutch Reformed Political Party politician
- Anne M. Houtman, American academic administrator

== See also ==
- Houtman Abrolhos, West Australian Island chain named after Frederick de Houtman
- 10650 Houtman, main-belt asteroid named after Cornelis de Houtman
- Hautman, surname
