= 16th Street Bridge (Washington, D.C.) =

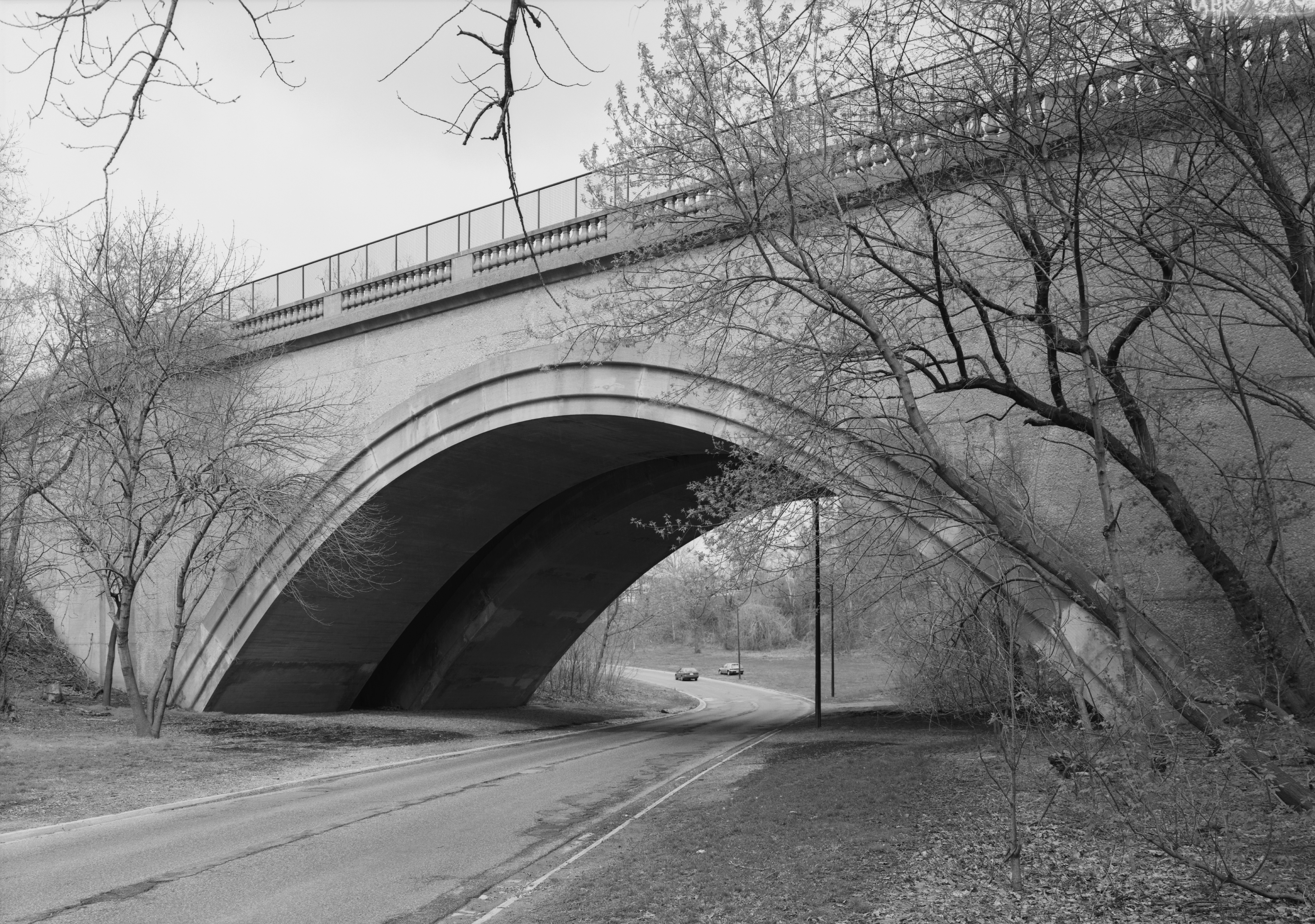
- Looking at the west side of the 16th Street Bridge from Piney Branch Parkway NW
- Coordinates: 38.9382°N 77.0364°W
- Carries: 16th Street NW
- Crosses: Piney Branch and Piney Branch Parkway
- Locale: Washington, D.C., U.S.
- Other name: Piney Branch Bridge
- Owner: District of Columbia Department of Transportation
- Maintained by: District of Columbia Department of Transportation

Characteristics
- Total length: 272 feet (83 m)
- Width: 61 feet (19 m)
- Longest span: 125 feet (38 m)
- No. of spans: 1
- Load limit: 40 short tons (36 t)

History
- Architect: J.J. Morrow and W.J. Douglas
- Constructed by: Pennsylvania Bridge Company (first span); Cranford Paving Company (second span)
- Construction start: September 1905 (first span); June 1909 (second span)
- Construction end: January 1908 (first span); April 1910 (second span)
- Construction cost: $165,000 ($5,701,339 in 2025 dollars)
- Opened: April 15, 1910

Statistics
- Daily traffic: 30,000 vehicles per day

Location
- Interactive map of 16th Street Bridge

The 16th Street Bridge, also known as the Piney Branch Bridge, is an automobile and pedestrian bridge that carries 16th Street NW over Piney Branch and Piney Branch Parkway in Washington, D.C. It was the first parabolic arch bridge in the United States. Construction on the first span began in 1905 as part of the northward extension of 16th Street, and was finished in 1907 but was never opened to traffic. The second span began construction in 1909 and was completed in 1910. The bridge was renovated in 1990, and again beginning in October 2014.

The bridge, which spans the Piney Branch addition to Rock Creek Park, sits at the corner of four Washington, D.C., neighborhoods: Sixteenth Street Heights, Crestwood, Columbia Heights, and Mount Pleasant.

== Description ==
The 16th Street Bridge is 272 feet (83 m) long. Its span is 125 feet (38 m) in length, and has a rise of 45 feet (14 m). The span is a parabolic arch, the first built in the United States and the longest in the world at the time, according to its designer, W.J. Douglas. The abutments and substructure of the bridge are of reinforced concrete; the arch itself is not reinforced with steel. The interior of the bridge is hollow. Square vertical interior columns 2 feet (0.61 m) in length on each side support the road deck. A latticework of horizontal square beams, each 1 square foot (0.093 m^{2}) in size, intersect the columns and are set perpendicular to one another. This system of columns and beams compress the arch and keep it stable as well push outward against the walls. The bridge's abutments are hollow. The abutments are stabilized by soil pressing against them from the outside, and the system of beams and columns on the interior of the bridge.

The walls of the bridge and the abutments are 2 feet (0.61 m) thick. A bluish crushed diorite was added to the concrete used to pour the walls of the abutments and the spandrel walls, which were left unfinished, and reflect the texture of the wooden forms used to create them. However, the archivolt, balustrade, and pilasters, whose concrete includes yellow sand and crushed granite, have a much different texture. These elements were removed from their molds before the concrete was fully hardened, then roughened with stiff brushes, helping to expose the granite particles within and make them glitter in the sun.

The bridge superstructure rests on walls and columns. The 25-foot (7.6 m) wide spans are of reinforced concrete. Steel beams, their ends resting on the walls of the two bridges, close the gap between the spans. Reinforced concrete slabs lie atop these beams to create a unified deck. Concrete balustrades and newels create a railing on the east and west sides of the bridge. The road is 45 feet (14 m) wide, and 8-foot (2.4 m) sidewalks are on either side of the roadway. Granite curbs define the cement sidewalk. The deck is topped by asphalt. At 65 feet (20 m) in width (roadway and sidewalks), the deck was the widest in the city when built and could support 40 short tons (36 t).

The bridge has four ornamental cast iron lampposts. The ends of the bridge are flanked by two bronze reclining tigers on concrete pedestals. The archivolt consists of three arch rings, and is of smoothed concrete. Pilasters flank the arch on the sides of the bridge. Stylistically, the bridge is Neoclassical in design.

The bridge cost about $135,000 to build.

== Construction ==
=== Authorization of the first span ===
On March 30, 1899, the United States Congress authorized the extension of 16th Street NW from Morris Road NW (now Monroe Street NW) to the D.C.-Maryland line. Condemnation proceedings to obtain land began on December 2, 1900, were completed on May 27, 1901, and were approved by the Supreme Court of the District of Columbia on April 19, 1902. By November 1903, work had almost reached the stream known as Piney Branch, which runs through a valley about 60 feet (18 m) below the grade of the street. On December 10, 1903, the Commissioners of the District of Columbia (Note: Beginning in 1874, the District of Columbia was run by three commissioners, two of which were appointed by the President of the United States with the approval of the Senate and a third member who was selected by the United States Army Corps of Engineers (and who had oversight over the city's public works). One of the civilian members was chosen to act as president of the city commission.) asked Congress for a 300-foot (91 m) bridge to carry one or two lanes of 16th Street NW over Piney Branch. The bridge, whose cost was estimated at $50,000 ($1,791,667 in 2025 dollars), would be long enough to permit a parkway to pass beneath it.

In March 1904, the commissioners' request finally saw action. Senator Jacob Gallinger (R-New Hampshire) offered an amendment to the Senate's 1905 District of Columbia appropriations bill which both authorized the city to construct the bridge and appropriated (Note: In public budgeting, a program must be authorized by law first. Often, an authorization sets the maximum amount of funds a program may expend in a single year. This does not mean the program is actually funded. An appropriation is needed to actually given the authorized program access to funds. Appropriations may be less than, equal to, or more than the authorization.) $50,000 ($1,791,667 in 2025 dollars) for this purpose. The House D.C. appropriations bill also contained the same language, but this provision was stricken from the bill on the floor of the house on March 18. Undeterred, the Senate Committee on the District of Columbia included the bridge authorization in the 1905 D.C. appropriations bill just five days later. The legislation, however, authorized a $50,000 concrete bridge but appropriated only $20,000 ($716,667 in 2025 dollars) for its construction. Half the money came from the federal government, and half from the city.

A fight erupted on the floor of the Senate over the bridge provision. Both the Senate Appropriations Committee and the Senate Committee on the District of Columbia approved the bridge. But many Senators were unhappy that the federal budget was increasing rapidly. The bill was held up for 10 months, while Senators worked behind the scenes to resolve these differences. The D.C. appropriations bill did not reach the Senate floor for another 10 months. When the bill did reach the chamber floor on February 15, 1905, Senator Stephen B. Elkins (R-West Virginia) demanded that the bridge provision be removed. Senator William B. Allison (R-Iowa) rose to support the expenditure. Their floor fight lasted three full days. Elkins claimed on February 16 that no citizens of the city wanted the bridge, and he demanded a full Senate vote on the bridge amendment. Senator Allison replied on February 17 by bringing in petitions from the Brightwood Citizens Association and the Mt. Pleasant Citizens Association asking for construction of the bridge, and pointing out that these petitions had been delivered to the Senate some months ago. Although Elkins won a vote on the amendment, the Senate overwhelmingly approved its inclusion in the final bill on February 17, ending the three-day floor fight.

A conference committee was now appointed by the House and Senate to reconcile the two different D.C appropriations bills. The House voted on February 18 to instruct its conferees to oppose the bridge amendment. The conference began meeting the week of February 20. On Sunday, February 26, the conferees agreed to include the bridge authorization and expenditure in the 1905 D.C. appropriations bill. The conference bill was introduced in the Senate on February 28, and hours later it approved the legislation. The House unanimously approved it on the afternoon of March 1. President Theodore Roosevelt signed the bill into law a few days later.

=== Constructing the first span ===
==== Designs and selection of contractor ====
At the time the bridge was approved, Piney Branch was nearly impassable. A rough pine bridge existed at the site of the new bridge to permit pedestrian traffic, while horses and wagons used a nearby ford.

With four months to prepare architectural designs for the bridge before the federal funds became available, the city was ready to build the bridge in July 1905. Major J.J. Morrow, Assistant Engineer Commissioner for the District of Columbia, and W.J. Douglas, Engineer of Bridges for the District of Columbia, submitted sketches of the bridge to the commissioners on July 12. The bridge's final design was by Douglas and city engineer William N. Reynolds (who was also the engineer in charge of construction). H.T. Pratt was the architectural draughtsman. Stylistically, the 16th Street Bridge was to look like the Connecticut Avenue Bridge (built between 1897 and 1907). Their design for the concrete bridge showed a span 125 feet (38 m) long and a road deck 20 to 25 feet (6.1 to 7.6 m) wide, and with as much ornamentation as budget would allow. By early August, the plans for the bridge were complete. The bridge would be 272 feet (83 m) long, with a 25-foot (7.6 m) wide road deck. The 125-foot (38 m) long span would rise 60 feet (18 m) above the valley floor. The bridge would be made of reinforced concrete and steel, with hollow spandrels between the arch and abutments. The roof and walls of the arch and the walls of the abutments ranged from 10 to 20 inches (25 to 51 cm) in thickness. Square columns, 2 feet (0.61 m) in length on each side, supported the road deck, and were linked internally by a latticework of 1 square foot (0.093 m^{2}) horizontal concrete beams (which helped to compress the arch and keep it stable as well push outward against the walls).

Although the Piney Branch Bridge (as it was then known) was designed to carry two lanes of traffic and be a completed structure, the D.C. Commissioners expected to build a second span as soon as possible. This would expand the road deck to 70 feet (21 m). Subsequently, the first span was built 20 feet (6.1 m) off the centerline of 16th Street.

Engineers estimated the foundations for the bridge would be complete before the onset of cold weather in December. Construction bids were advertised on August 26, 1905, and six bids were received by the September 16 deadline. The Pennsylvania Bridge Company was selected to construct the bridge. Although Congress had appropriated only $20,000 for the job, the city issued a contract worth $42,731 ($1,531,194 in 2025 dollars).

==== 8-hour day law dispute ====
In 1892, Congress enacted an eight-hour day law which applied to contractors doing work on behalf of the federal government. As the District of Columbia was a creature of the federal government, the law also applied to city workers and contractors engaged in work for the city.

In July 1906, a broad investigation into violation of the eight-hour day law by the Pennsylvania Bridge Company was begun by federal inspectors. The company was indicted on July 28, and plead not-guilty. On October 1, city attorneys charged the company with additional violations of the eight-hour law. Initially, John Meigs, the civil engineer in charge of the work, refused to surrender the company's accounting books to the grand jury investigating the alleged crime. The grand jurors complained to D.C. criminal court, which threatened the company with contempt of court. After a discussion between company lawyers and the city, the books were released to the grand jury. The company was again indicted, and again plead not guilty.

The Pennsylvania Bridge Company admitted it had forced workers to stay on the job nine and sometimes 10 hours a day. But it offered two defenses. First, the company said that the District of Columbia had set such stringent deadlines for construction that the company had no choice but to violate the law. Second, the company said that many skilled workers would not work for less than 10 hours a day, and it had acceded to their demands. Neither argument was persuasive to the jury, and the company was found guilty. A $1,500 fine ($53,750 in 2025 dollars) was imposed on the firm.

==== Completion ====
With the bridge's foundations and abutments underway, additional federal funds were needed to complete the span and road deck. In October 1905, the D.C. Commissioners requested another $30,000 ($1,075,000 in 2025 dollars) from Congress. The Subcommittee of the House Appropriations Committee added the $30,000 appropriation, and legislation making the appropriation passed on April 17, 1906. By June 30, the end of the fiscal year, $15,000 ($537,500 in 2025 dollars) had been expended on the bridge's construction.

The bridge was poured in place. By mid-November 1906, the bridge was halfway completed, and construction officials estimated it would be finished in early 1907. This estimate proved significantly over-optimistic. On December 1, company officials declared the bridge "almost ready", except for the approaches. (Note: Approaches are the portion of a roadway connecting with a bridge which has no reasonable other use than as a means of connecting to the bridge. Approahces may be nonexistent in some cases, while in others they may consist of embankments, ramps, and other elements.) Yet, a month later, the bridge was still under construction. By mid-March 1907, construction was still not finished.

Finally, on June 9, contractors said the bridge would be completed on July 1, 1907. The approaches, however, were not complete. D.C. officials had only just received seven bids for their construction, and awarded the $28,000 contract ($967,500 in 2025 dollars) to Hoffman Construction. The total cost of the structure was estimated to be between $44,000 and $60,000 ($1,520,357 to $2,073,214 in 2025 dollars).

Work on grading the approaches was still going on in October 1907. At that time, Hoffman Construction estimated they would be done by January 1, 1908. Grading was nearly complete by early December 1907.

The 16th Street Bridge was completed and ready to accept traffic on December 27, 1907. Commissioners Henry B.F. Macfarland and J.J. Morrow drove over the bridge to inaugurate it informally. The bridge was not, however, actually opened to traffic. It remained complete but closed.

=== Construction of the second span ===
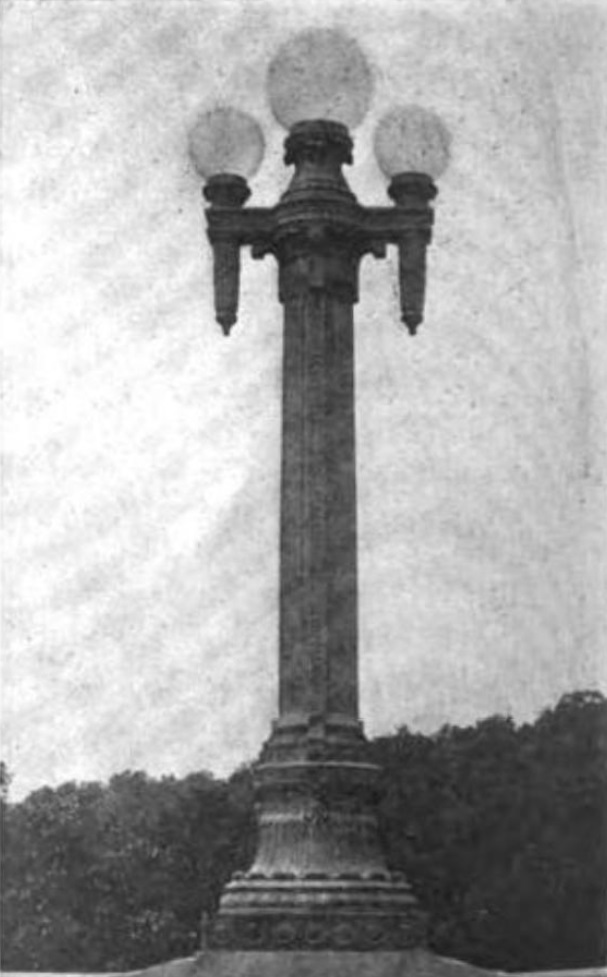
Original lighting standard used on the 16th Street Bridge in 1910.

By 1908, the economizing mood of Congress had lessened. D.C. officials sought permission to complete the second span of the 16th Street Bridge, and on April 28, 1908, Senator Thomas H. Carter (R-Montana) offered an amendment to the D.C. appropriations bill to authorize construction of a second span and widen the bridge to a full 60 feet (18 m). No funds were appropriated for this purpose, however. The amendment was not accepted, and the 1909 fiscal year started without them.

in December 1908, the D.C. Commissioners again asked Congress for permission to build a second span. The roadway would not be 65 feet (20 m), and the span's cost estimated at $85,000 ($3,045,833 in today's dollars). The House Appropriations Committee approved the funding request on January 6, 1909. The Subcommittee on the District of Columbia of the Senate Appropriations Committee followed suit on February 2. A House–Senate conference committee approved the funding on February 27, and President Theodore Roosevelt signed the legislation into law.

The D.C. Commissioners advertised for construction bids on May 8, 1909. Eight bids were received, with Cranford Paving Company receiving the contract. Design of the second span was nearly the identical to the first, and Captain Edward M. Markham (assistant to the engineer commissioner) and C.B. Hunt (D.C. Engineer of Highways) oversaw the construction. The estimated time for completion of the span was January 1, 1910.

As with the first span, the second span was poured in place. Although construction of the first span had occurred without any reported accidents, construction on the second span did not proceed as safely. On August 14, 1906, an African American worker had his hand crushed on the job site. Despite the accident, construction officials still estimated the time of completion at January 1.

On September 22, 1909, the city entered into a contract with sculptor A. Phimister Proctor to sculpt four reclining tigers in bronze to adorn the ends of the bridge. It is not clear how Proctor was chosen for the job. As models, Proctor studied tigers at the Bronx Zoo, and he sculpted the statues in his New York City studio. The Gorham Company cast the statues, each of which was 10 feet (3.0 m) long and weighed 1 short ton (0.91 t). (Note: Proctor cast four tigers for the Piney Branch Bridge. After slightly changing the models, two more were cast for placement outside Nassau Hall at Princeton University.)

In October 1909, the city advertised bids for lighting for the bridge. Four ornamental lampposts, in either bronze or cast iron, were required. Five bids were received in November, R. L. Watmaugh, a Washington architect, received the lighting contract. The lamps were incandescent lights which used a tungsten filament. An armored steel cable, run under the granite curb, provided power to the lights. Each light gave off 100 watts or 78.48 candela. The lamppost had three globes: A 24-inch (61 cm) central globe and two 17-inch (43 cm) side globes. The central globe was 20 feet (6.1 m) above the roadway, and each lamppost was 160 feet (49 m) apart.

A second accident occurred during the construction of the second span on March 16, 1909. Howard Hurley, a 43-year-old African American worker, died instantly when a wooden beam fell on his skull, crushing it.

As the bridge neared completion, D.C. architect R. L. Watmaugh won a contract to design and manufacture ornamental concrete balustrades for either side of the bridge. The two separate spans were linked as construction ended. Holes were cut in the top of the western wall of the first span. Steel beams were laid at intervals across the open space, the ends of each beam resting on the wall of the span. A concrete slab was then laid across the beams to create the roadway's sub-deck. The 16th Street Bridge opened to traffic on April 15, 1909. The total cost of both spans was estimated at $140,000 ($4,837,500 in today's dollars).

== Operation ==
=== Effects ===
A few weeks after the bridge opened, contractors completed a $30,000 ($1,036,607 in today's dollars) road project that extended 16th Street several blocks north of the 16th Street Bridge.

The impact of the 16th Street Bridge was substantial. The Mt. Pleasant Heights subdivision opened shortly after construction of the first span, and building lots sold briskly. The price of land along 16th Street NW skyrocketed by 500 percent from 1904 to 1910. In December 1911, the Sixteenth Street Heights subdivision opened. Developers reported that they had seen a 200 percent increase in property values since the second span opened.

=== Renovations ===
In 1990, the 16th Street Bridge underwent its first renovation. The extent of the work was not clear, but the $3 million ($7,393,021 in 2025 dollars) project took 15 months to complete. At least one lane of the bridge was closed during rush hour. The Proctor tigers were regilded during the renovation.
