= Beukers =

Beukers is a Dutch surname. Notable people with the surname include:

- Daniël Beukers (born 2004), Dutch footballer
- Frits Beukers (born 1953), Dutch mathematician
- Nicole Beukers (born 1990), Dutch rower
- Petrus Beukers (1899–1981), Dutch sailor

== See also ==
- Beckers
