= Hausmann =

Hausmann is a German word with former meanings "householder" and "freeholder" and current meaning "house-husband."

Hausmann (Hausman), Haussmann (Haussman), Haußmann, Hauszmann, etc. are German-origin surnames that may refer to:

== Hausmann ==
- Caspar Herman Hausmann (1653–1718), Danish-Norwegian General, lumber merchant and squire
- Carl Hausman (born 1953), Author, journalist, and educator
- Christian Hausmann (born 1963), German football player
- Clem Hausmann (1919–1972), Major League baseball pitcher
- David Hausmann (born 1979), German fencer
- George Hausmann (1916–2004), Major League baseball player
- Helmut Haussmann (born 1943), German politician
- Jake Hausmann (born 1998), American football player
- Johann Friedrich Ludwig Hausmann (1782–1859), German mineralogist
- Jürgen B. Hausmann (born 1964), pseudonym of Jürgen Beckers, German cabaret performer and comedian
- Larry Hausmann (born 1941), U.S. soccer midfielder
- Michel Hausmann (19??–), Venezuelan theater director and producer
- Raoul Hausmann (1886–1971), German Dadaist sculptor and writer from Vienna
- Ricardo Hausmann (born 1956), former minister of Venezuela and Professor at Harvard University
- Robert Hausmann (1852–1909), German cellist
- Sahra Hausmann (born 1973), Norwegian team handball player

=== Locations ===
- The Theodore Hausmann Estate, historic site in Vero Beach, Florida
- 16524 Hausmann (1991 BB3), main-belt asteroid, discovered 1991

== Hausman ==
- Alice Hausman (born 1942), Minnesota politician
- Daniel M. Hausman (born 1947), U.S. philosopher of economics
- Gerald Hausman (born 1945), American author of books about Native America, animals, mythology, and West Indian culture
- Jerry A. Hausman (born 1946, Weirton, West Virginia), US econometrician, developed "Hausman Specification Test"
  - The Hausman test, or Hausman specification test, a statistical test in econometrics, named after Jerry A. Hausman
- Jonathan Hausman (born 1957), American Conservative rabbi
- Michael Hausman (born 19??), US percussionist and manager, cofounded United Musicians
- René Hausman (1936–2016), Belgian comic-book writer and artist
- Tom Hausman (1953–2019, Mobridge, South Dakota), US baseball player
- Walter Ader Hausman, Chilean chess master
- Wendy Hausman, American politician

== Haussmann, Haußmann or Hauszmann ==
Two prominent German families bear this name or variants.

=== Haußmann of Oberboihingen ===
The first prominent German family called Haußmann originated in Reudern, near Oberboihingen in Württemberg, the earliest known member being Hans Haußmann, born circa 1450, died before 1526. From this family descended several politicians and actors. Descendants of his sons, who resided in Oberboihingen, include:

- Ezard Haußmann (1935–2010), German actor
- Leander Haußmann (also Haussmann) (born 1959, Quedlinburg), German actor, theatre- and film director

=== Other people ===
- Alajos Hauszmann (1847–1926), Hungarian architect of Bavarian origin
- Elias Gottlob Haussmann (1695, Gera – 1774, Leipzig)
- Emil Haussmann (1910–1947), German SS-officer charged with crimes against humanity
- Georges-Eugène Haussmann (commonly known as Baron Haussmann) (1809–1891), French official who rebuilt Paris into a modern city
- Hans Haußmann (1900–1972), German field hockey player
- Helmut Haussmann (born 1943), German academic and politician
- John Houseman, born Jacques Haussmann (1902–1988), Jewish French-Romanian/US actor and film producer
- Michael Haussman (born 19??), director, writer, and producer
- Valentin Haussmann (died c. 1611), German composer
- William M. Haussmann Sr. (1906–1988), architect

== See also ==
- Hausmannstätten
- Hausmania
- Hausmannite
- Housman
- Houseman (disambiguation)
- Agricola (disambiguation), Latin translation
