= Robert Simpson Woodward House =

Historic house in Washington, D.C., United States

- U.S. National Register of Historic Places
- U.S. National Historic Landmark
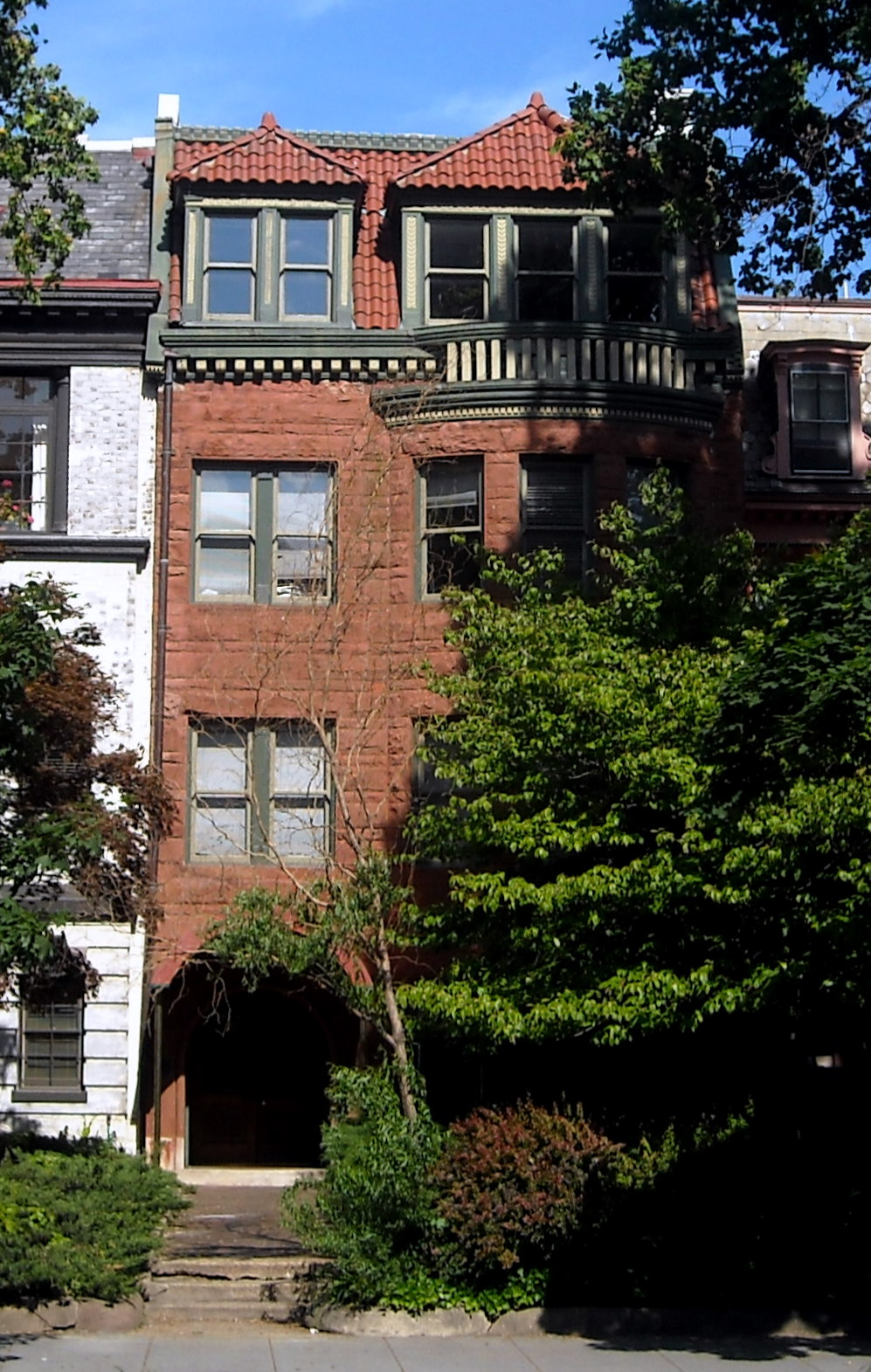

- Location within Washington, D.C. Location within the United States
- Location: 1513 16th Street, NW Washington, D.C.
- Coordinates: 38°54′32″N 77°2′11″W
- Built: 1895
- Architect: William M. Conley
- Architectural style: Richardsonian Romanesque
- NRHP reference No.: 76002136

Significant dates
- Added to NRHP: January 7, 1976
- Designated NHL: January 7, 1976

The Robert Simpson Woodward House is a former residence located at 1513 16th Street, NW in the Dupont Circle neighborhood of Washington, D.C. From 1904 until 1914, it was a home of geologist Robert Simpson Woodward (1849–1924), the first president of the Carnegie Institution and a highly regarded scientist and science administrator. The building currently serves as the Capital Research Center headquarters. It was declared a National Historic Landmark in 1976 and designated a contributing property to the Sixteenth Street Historic District in 1978.

== Description and history ==
The Robert Simpson Woodward House is located a short way north of Scott Circle, on the east side of 16th Street NW between P and Church Streets. It is a four-story brick building with Romanesque styling, and is not of particular architectural significance. Prominent features include hipped dormers with tile roofing, the entrance recessed under a rounded arch, and the right-side curved window bay that extends to the third floor.

The house was built in 1895 and designed by William M. Conley. Robert Simson Woodward lived in this house from 1904 to 1914. He apparently moved frequently in his lifetime, and this building is one of his longest residencies. A native of Michigan, Woodward studied civil engineering at the University of Michigan before landing a job at the United States Geological Survey. In a long and distinguished career, Woodward made substantive contributions to the fields of astronomy, mathematics, surveying, and geology. He was also known as an effective administrator, serving as dean of the Columbia University School of Pure Science before becoming the first head of the Carnegie Institution in 1903.

== See also ==
- List of National Historic Landmarks in the District of Columbia
- National Register of Historic Places listings in the upper NW Quadrant of Washington, D.C.
