= Piney Branch =

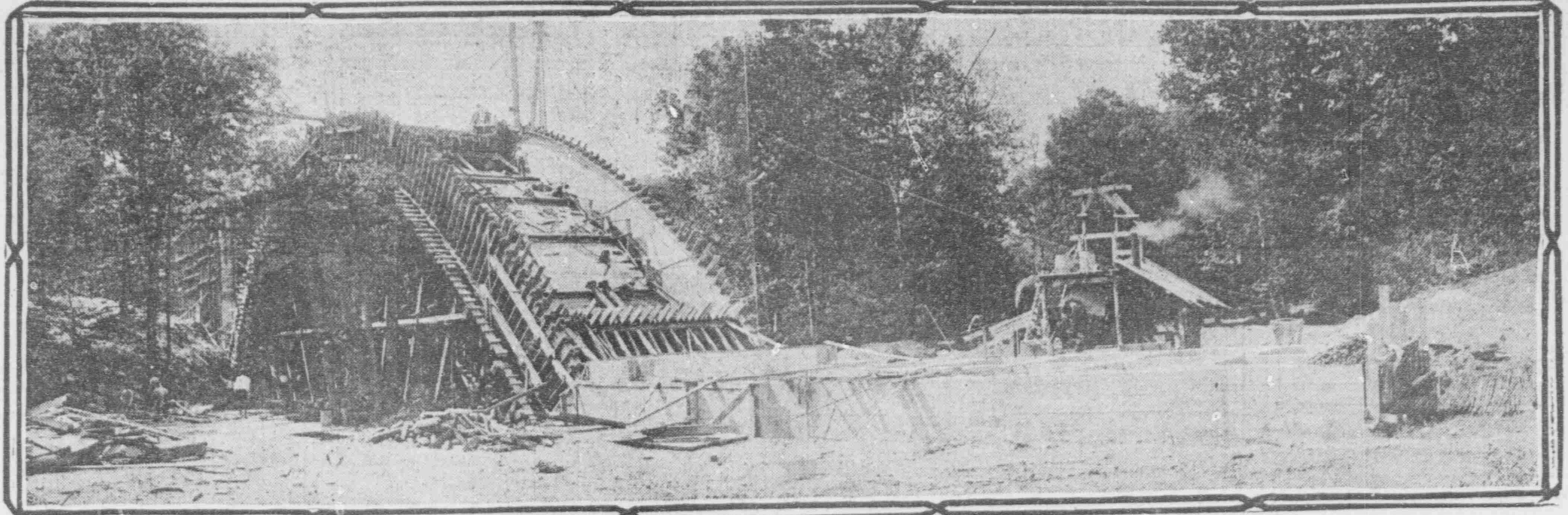
- Construction photo of the 16th Street Bridge over Piney Branch

Location
- Country: United States
- Federal district: District of Columbia

Physical characteristics
- Mouth
  - location: Rock Creek (Potomac River)
- Length: 0.75 mi (1.21 km)
- Basin size: 2,500 acres (10 km^{2})

Piney Branch is a tributary of Rock Creek in Washington, D.C. It is the largest tributary located entirely within the Washington city limits. It is spanned by the 16th Street Bridge, the country's first parabolic arch bridge.

== Course ==
Located in the Northwest quadrant of Washington, D.C., the stream flows next to Piney Branch Parkway and empties into Rock Creek near the intersection of the parkway and Beach Drive, inside Rock Creek Park. Rock Creek drains to the Potomac River, which empties into the Chesapeake Bay.

Piney Branch is a first order stream (i.e., no tributaries) with a surface length of 0.75 miles (1.21 km). It is generally about 12 feet (3.7 m) wide and 4 inches (10 cm) deep. It is the largest tributary located entirely within the Washington city limits.

== Watershed and water quality ==
Piney Branch drains a watershed of 0.48 square miles (1.2 km^{2}). About five percent of the watershed consists of forested parkland near its surface stream. The rest of the area is mainly residential, with some light industrial zones.

In 2010, the creek was listed as polluted by 10 chemicals and four metals: lead, copper, zinc, and arsenic.

In 2014, DC Water began design work on the Piney Branch Trunk Sewer Rehabilitation Project, a series of repairs and improvements to the combined sewer system that discharges into the creek. Composed of 8- to 10-foot brick and concrete pipes, the Piney Branch Trunk Sewer is one of the city's major trunk sewers. Project design was slated to start in January 2014 and last one year. As of early 2016, work was to begin in 2017 and last until 2019.

Four combined sewer systems discharge into the stream. Combined sewer overflow (CSO) discharges during heavy storms, where stormwater and untreated sewage enters the stream, can cause serious water pollution problems. DC Water is planning to construct a water storage tunnel that will reduce the environmental impact of CSOs on Piney Branch and Rock Creek. The tunnel is designed to capture and store a minimum of 4.2 million gallons of sewage combined with stormwater that would otherwise overflow into Piney Branch during large storms. As of 2025, the tunnel project is expected to be complete by 2029.

== History ==
In prehistoric times, the creek's valley was a source of quartzite cobbles for toolmaking. One quarry site is located at the bluffs overlooking Piney Branch from the north, about 30 feet below the summit of a southeast-facing hill. Dubbed the "Piney Branch Quarry Site", it was first examined by archeologist William Henry Holmes in 1889 and 1890. Another investigation begin in 2006 revealed quartzite debitage, whole and broken turtleback “preforms,” and half of a large ax.

In the mid-1800s, the creek's valley was the location of the first road through the area that would become Rock Creek Park. Called Piney Branch Road or 14th Street Road, the narrow country way went north from the Mount Pleasant neighborhood down into the valley, across a rickety bridge just west of today's 16th Street Bridge, then climbed up to the present-day neighborhood of Crestwood.

Funding to build the Piney Branch Parkway, which runs along the creek for most of its length, was "authorized in 1907, but not built until the mid-1930s when funding and workers became available through the New Deal."

== See also ==
- List of rivers of Washington, D.C.
