= Houseman (surname) =

Houseman is a surname. Notable people with the surname include:

- Edward Houseman (1869–1942), English cricketer
- Ian Houseman (born 1969), English cricketer
- John Houseman (1902–1988), Romanian-born American actor and film producer
- John Houseman (baseball) (1870–1922), Dutch-born American baseball infielder
- Julius Houseman (1832–1891), American entrepreneur and politician
- Peter Houseman (1945–1977), English footballer
- René Houseman (1953–2018), Argentine footballer
- Susan Houseman (born 1956), American economist

== Fictional characters ==
- Jim Houseman, the fictional United States Secretary of Defense in the game Metal Gear Solid

== See also ==
- Housman (surname)
