= Robert Simpson Woodward =

American mathematician

Robert S. Woodward

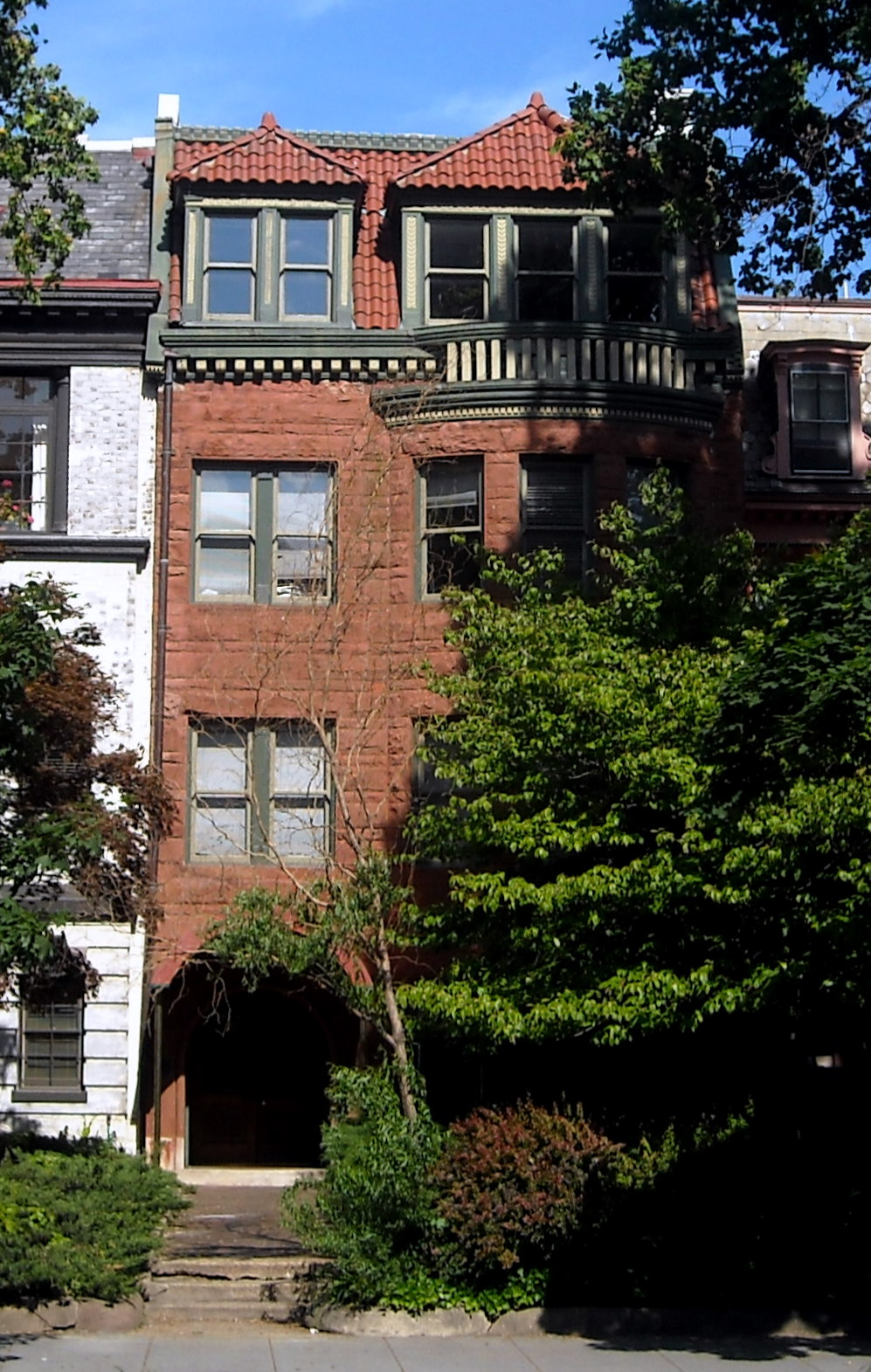
The Robert Simpson Woodward House in Washington, D.C., a National Historic Landmark

Robert Simpson Woodward (July 21, 1849 – June 29, 1924) was an American civil engineer, physicist and mathematician.

== Biography ==
He was born at Rochester, Michigan, on July 21, 1849, to Lysander Woodward and Peninah A. Simpson.

He graduated with a degree in civil engineering at the University of Michigan in 1872. He was appointed assistant engineer on the United States Lake Survey. In 1882 he became assistant astronomer for the United States Transit of Venus Commission. In 1884 he became astronomer to the United States Geological Survey, serving until 1890, when he was hired by Thomas Corwin Mendenhall as assistant in the United States Coast and Geodetic Survey. In 1893 he was called to Columbia as professor of mechanics and subsequently became professor of mathematical physics as well. He was dean of the faculty of pure science at Columbia from 1895 to 1905, when he became president of the Carnegie Institution of Washington, whose reputation and usefulness as a means of furthering scientific research was widely extended under his direction. He was elected to the National Academy of Sciences in 1896. In 1898-1900 he was president of the American Mathematical Society, and in 1900 he became President of the American Association for the Advancement of Science. In 1902, he was elected as a member to the American Philosophical Society. In 1915 he was appointed to the Naval Consulting Board.

He died on June 29, 1924, in Washington, D.C.

== Legacy ==
Professor Woodward carried on researches and published papers in many departments of astronomy, geodesy, and mechanics. In the course of his work with the United States Coast and Geodetic Survey he devised and constructed the "iced bar and long tape base apparatus," which enables a base line to be measured with greater accuracy and with less expense than by methods previously employed. His work on the composition and structure of the earth and the variation of latitude found expression in a number of valuable papers.

== Publications ==
- Geographical Tables (1897; third edition, 1906)
- Probability and Theory of Errors (1906).

== See also ==
- Robert Simpson Woodward House
- Gilman, Daniel Coit; Peck, Harry Thurston; Colby, Frank Moore, eds. (1905). "Woodward, Robert Simpson". The New International Encyclopædia. Vol. XX (1 ed.). New York: Dodd, Mead and Company. p. 639.
