= Hautman =

Hautman is a surname. Notable people with the surname include:

- Jim Hautman, American painter, brother of Joe and Robert
- Joe Hautman (born 1956), American painter
- Pete Hautman (born 1952), American writer
- Robert Hautman, American painter

== See also ==
- Hartman
