= 16th Street World War I Memorial Trees =

War memorial in Washington, D.C., United States

The World War I 16th Street Memorial Trees, honoring the lives of District of Columbia residents killed in World War I, are located on 16th Street NW in Washington, D.C., between Alaska Avenue and Varnum Street. A gift to the city from the D.C. department of the American Legion, the memorial originally consisted of 507 trees and markers, one for each resident known to have perished during the war.

== Dedication ==
In 1920, 507 Norway Maple trees were planted about 40 feet (12 m) apart along the 2.5 miles (4.0 km) stretch of 16th Street NW between Alaska Avenue and Varnum Street. Each tree is accompanied by a small concrete marker with a bronze plate. The markers are about six to eight inches tall, with a sloping top and a bronze plate. Each plate bore a dead service member's name, their branch of service, and the words "Memorial Tree, World War, 1917-18." The markers are arranged in alphabetical order, from Edward D. Adams in the north to Randolph T. Zane to the south. At least six of the markers are dedicated to women who perished in the war.

The memorial was dedicated on Sunday, May 30, 1920. About 10,000 District residents attended the 4 p.m. ceremony, which consisted of a parade by the American Legion and other veteran organizations, with music performed by the United States Marine Band. Assistant Secretary of War Benedict Crowell and District Commissioner Louis Brownlow made brief addresses.

== 20th century ==
By 1922, the total number of trees comprising the memorial had increased to 533. In the years following the dedication and into the 1950s, the trees were decorated and the street was a gathering point for Memorial Day celebrations and remembrances. The closely planted tree canopy created an attractive passage into downtown Washington, coinciding with active development along 16th Street in the 1920s and 30s.

However, it was not long before the markers and trees began to fall victim to automobile accidents, theft, unintentional damage due to utility and landscape maintenance, and general indifference. The American Legion set up slot machines in federal buildings to fund maintenance of the memorials, but a legal ruling in the 1950s banned such machines. The Legion's budget priorities fell elsewhere in subsequent decades, on projects such as the Vietnam Veterans Memorial and the World War II Memorial, and little attention was paid to the World War I memorial trees and markers.

As of 1982, only about three dozen trees remained, many of them not originals but saplings planted as replacements for lost trees. While several dozen concrete columns were still present, only one bronze marker could be located.

== 21st century ==
By 2000, the remaining concrete markers were largely flush with the earth and obscured by grass, and very few bronze markers remained.

In 2010, only two bronze markers remained, those of Leo Joseph and Private John Kendall. A ceremonial resolution was introduced by Phil Mendelson and passed by the Council of the District of Columbia on May 4, 2010, recognizing the 90th anniversary of the memorial's dedication and calling upon stakeholders to rededicate the memorial on its centennial, May 31, 2020.
