= William M. Haussmann Sr. =

American architect

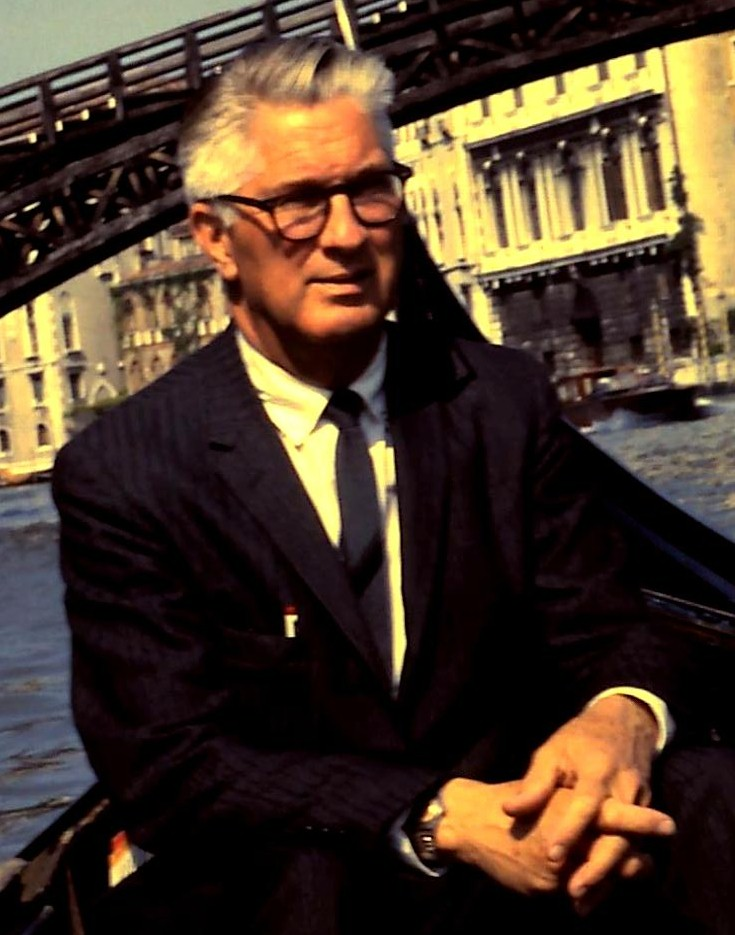
Bill Haussmann in Venice

William Max Haussmann Sr. (1906–1988) originally from Rockledge, Pennsylvania, was an American architect who specialized in historical restoration and preservation for the National Park Service (NPS). His 32-year federal career had a number of highlights, as it ranged from restoration work for the Sesquicentennial Celebration of 1931 in Yorktown, Virginia, to the restoration/reconstruction project of Ford's Theatre in the 1960s. He was a member of the American Institute of Architects (AIA).

== Personal life ==
Haussmann was the third of three children born to German immigrants: Carl Christian Haussmann from Oberboihingen, Württemberg, and Martha Louise (Kaiser), from Apolda, Thuringia. He was a lifelong Episcopalian; he was raised in the Memorial Church of the Holy Nativity, Episcopal Church, Rockledge, Pennsylvania. As a child, he met his future wife, Hannah "Marie" Vroom, whose family also attended this church; they married there in June 1933. They raised two children in Arlington, Virginia.

== Career ==
After earning a degree in architecture from the University of Pennsylvania in 1928, Haussmann worked for several architecture firms. In 1931, Haussmann took a job as an architect with the National Park Service (NPS) of the United States Department of the Interior. He remained with NPS for 32 years, specializing in historical restoration and preservation. When he retired in 1963, he was the Chief of the National Capital Parks Office of Design and Construction in Washington, D.C. After retirement, he continued private architecture work.

== Architectural projects ==
=== Government projects ===
- Yorktown, Virginia Sesquicentennial Projects (1931), to include Moore House, Yorktown, VA, Swan Tavern, Yorktown Sesquicentennial VIP and Special Guest Medallion-Shaped Badges (designer), and celebratory area arches and pylons (designer).
- McKinley Park Hotel, Seattle, WA
- Arlington House (Custis Lee Mansion), Arlington National Cemetery, VA
- Ford's Theatre, Washington, D.C. (chief design architect for the restoration)
- Peterson House, Washington, D.C. (supervised execution of restoration drawings)
- Old Stone House, M Street NW, Georgetown, D.C. (supervised execution of restoration drawings)
- Great Falls Tavern, MD (supervised execution of restoration drawings)
- Germantown White House (formerly Deshler-Morris House), Germantown near Philadelphia, PA
- Harry T. Thompson Boat Center, Washington, D.C. (architect)
- Rock Creek Nature Center, Washington, D. C. (architect)
- Watergate Concert Barges

==== Bridges and overpasses ====
Many of the bridges were influenced by the designs of Gilmore Clarke, who designed many of the bridges on the George Washington Memorial Parkway between Rosslyn and Mount Vernon.) The Bureau of Roads was responsible for the engineering aspects, while the NPS provided the architectural design. Many of the bridges are concrete, some with rock facing.)

- Baltimore-Washington Parkway bridge and overpass design
- Suitland Parkway bridge and overpass design
- Colonial Parkway bridge and overpass design
- George Washington Memorial Parkway bridges and overpasses, to include the Spout Run Bridge, Pimmit Run Bridge, and Donaldson Run Bridge.
- National Capital Parks Headquarters, Ohio Dr SW, D.C. (architect)
- Educational buildings and comfort stations for National Parks (architect); various locations.
- Carter Barron Amphitheatre, Rock Creek Park, D.C. (architect) 4,200 seats, opened in 1950 Carter Barron History - Rock Creek Park (U.S. National Park Service)
- Netherlands Carillon Tower, Arlington, VA (NPS project manager)
  - For his work associated with the Carillon Tower, Mr. Haussmann was awarded the Order of Orange-Nassau, Knight (5th Class), on behalf of the Queen of the Netherlands, April 20, 1955.
  - Note: Mr. Haussmann traveled to Europe in August 1952 in association with the "Bells for America" committee.

=== Private architecture projects ===
- Trinity Episcopal Church main sanctuary, Arlington, VA (1957). He was a longtime parishioner, vestryman, and member of the choir at this church.
- Other church projects for St. Andrew's (Arlington, VA) and St. Christopher's (Springfield, VA).
- Private family houses, including his own; several were located on his street: South 5th Street, Arlington, VA. (His house was constructed in 1935.)
- Park designs for Run Park, Accotink Park, and Burke Lake Park, Northern VA.
