= Marc Beckers =

German footballer

Personal information
- Full name: Marc Beckers
- Date of birth: 19 October 1973 (age 53)
- Place of birth: West Germany
- Position: Defender

Youth career
- SV 1910 Lürrip

Senior career*
Years	Team	Apps	(Gls)
1993–1995	Borussia Mönchengladbach	2	(0)
1995–1997	Fortuna Düsseldorf II		
1997–1999	Fortuna Düsseldorf	11	(0)
- * Club domestic league appearances and goals

Marc Beckers (born 19 October 1973) is a former German footballer.

Beckers made two appearances for Borussia Mönchengladbach in the Bundesliga during his playing career.
