= Crestwood (Washington, D.C.) =

Residential neighborhood in Washington, D.C.

Coordinates: 38.9413°N 77.0408°W

Map of Washington, D.C., with Crestwood highlighted in maroon

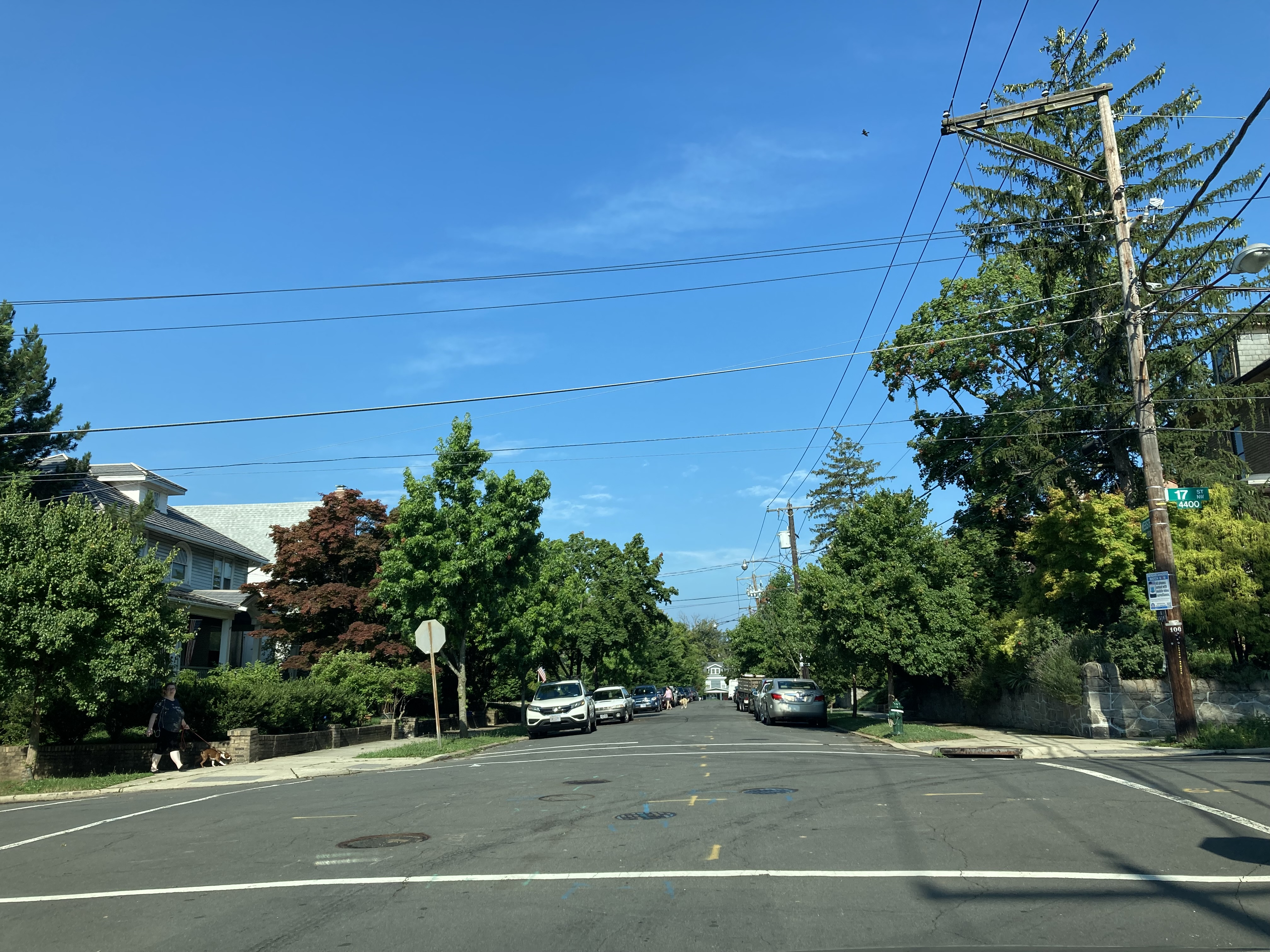
The intersection of 17th and Webster Streets NW, in Crestwood, July 2021

Crestwood is an entirely residential neighborhood located in Northwest Washington, D.C., and bordered on three sides by Rock Creek Park. Heading north from the White House on 16th Street, Crestwood is among the first neighborhoods that features single-family homes with larger lawns. It has many mature trees, and it is not uncommon to see deer and other wildlife from the park crossing the streets there.

Crestwood has been known as part of the "Gold Coast", an enclave of neighborhoods in Washington, D.C., known as a haven for affluent African American professionals; Crestwood as the "Gold Coast", is an important part of the African American history of the District of Columbia. At times throughout its history and currently today, Crestwood has experienced demographic changes, including regarding its ethnic and racial compositions, and currently, includes more families of diverse sexual orientations. It is home to families who have lived in the neighborhood for decades, as well as younger families.

Just to the north, residents can enjoy the natural surroundings of Rock Creek Park. The Carter Barron section of the Park with grassy fields and mature trees serves the public who use them for sunbathing, playing soccer (several local schools bus students to the fields to practice sports like soccer) and touch football (hosting league play on Sundays), walking and jogging on the paved track. Several picnic spots, including a wooden pavilion are in high demand during warmer weather. The park is bordered to the West by mature forests of tall trees. The facilities of the Carter Barron Amphitheatre and William H.G. FitzGerald Tennis Center, with public tennis courts are also located here. The amphitheatre once hosted concerts and free cultural events during the spring and summer; and is scheduled for renovation and re-opening soon. Crestwood is centrally located on 16th Street, being about fifteen minutes by car from both the K Street business district and downtown Silver Spring, Maryland.

The closest Metro stations are Georgia Avenue-Petworth and Columbia Heights on the Green Line and Van Ness-UDC on the Red Line. Buses run regularly on 16th Street to Silver Spring to the north and government offices, downtown stores and the National Mall to the south.
