= Ian Houseman =

English cricketer (born 1969)

Ian James Houseman (born 12 October 1969, Harrogate, Yorkshire, England) is an English first-class cricketer, who played five matches for Yorkshire County Cricket Club between 1989 and 1991.

A right arm fast medium bowler, he took three wickets at 103.88, with a best of 2 for 26 against the Indian tourists. He scored 18 against Sussex and 0 not out, in his only two innings.

He appeared for a host of other teams in non first-class cricket. These included England Young Cricketers (1989), Cumberland (1993), Yorkshire Second XI (1988–1992), Worcestershire Second XI (1993), MCC Schools (1986), National Cricket Association Young Cricketers (1986), National Association of Young Cricketers North (1987), National Association of Young Cricketers (1989) and Marylebone Cricket Club (1994).

Houseman went on to play amateur cricket, after retiring from the professional side of the game. He played for Harrogate C.C., Follifoot C.C. and finished off with captaining Dacre Banks C.C., in the Nidderdale League.

Record for Dacre Banks Cricket Club

Matches: 258 Innings: 180 Not Out: 41 Runs: 2728 HS: 100* Avge: 19.63

Overs: 1515.1 Mdns: 233 Runs: 5679 Wkts: 348 BB: 7-20 Avge: 16.32
