= Hubert Beckers =

German philosopher

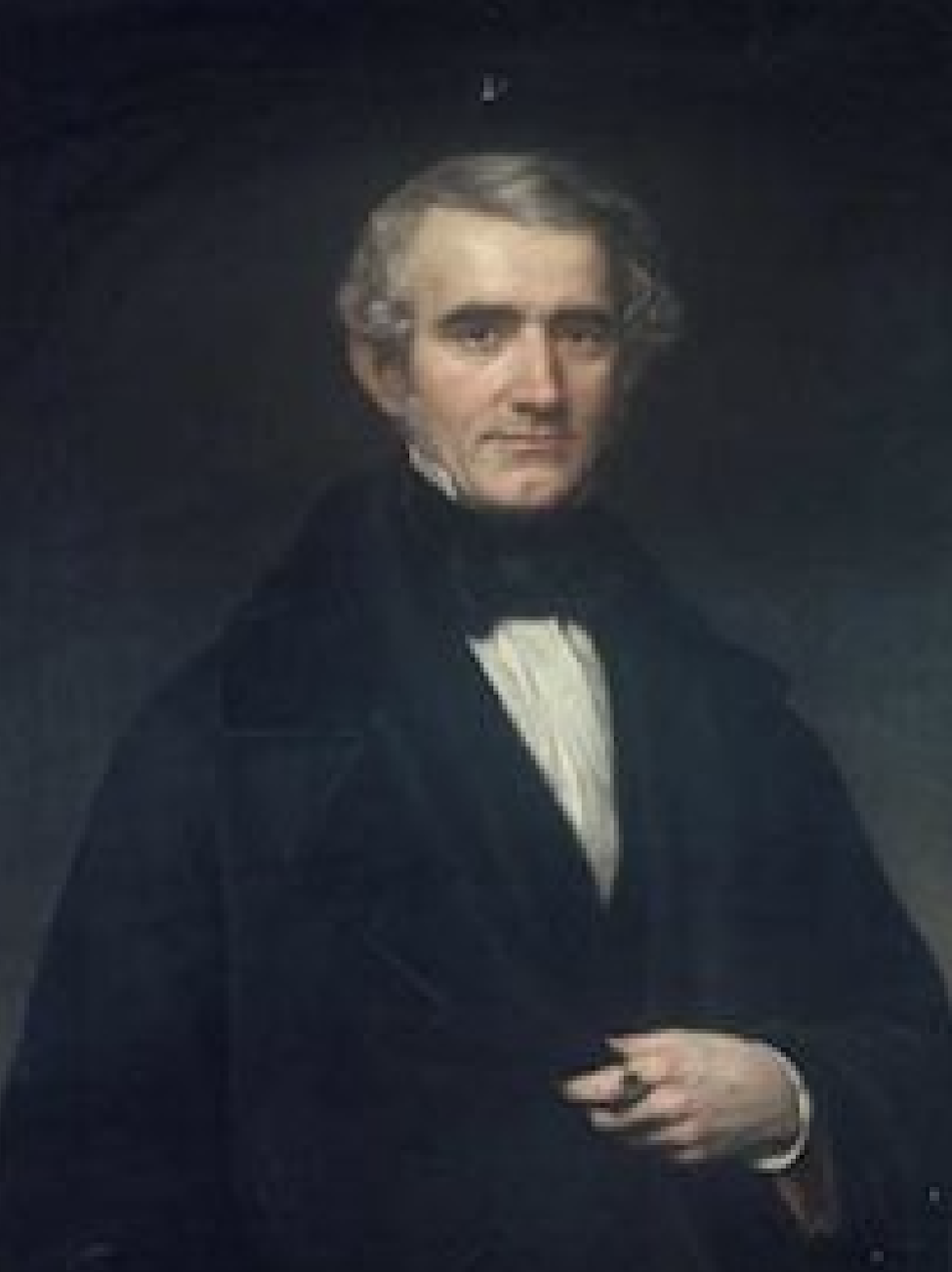
Hubert Beckers

Hubert Karl Philipp Beckers (4 November 1806 – 10 March 1889) was a German philosopher known chiefly as an expositor of the philosophy of Schelling.

He was born at Munich, and studied at the university there. In 1832, he was appointed professor of philosophy at the Lyceum at Dillingen, and in 1847 professor of philosophy at the Ludwig-Maximilians-Universität München. In 1853, he became a member of the Bavarian Academy of Sciences.

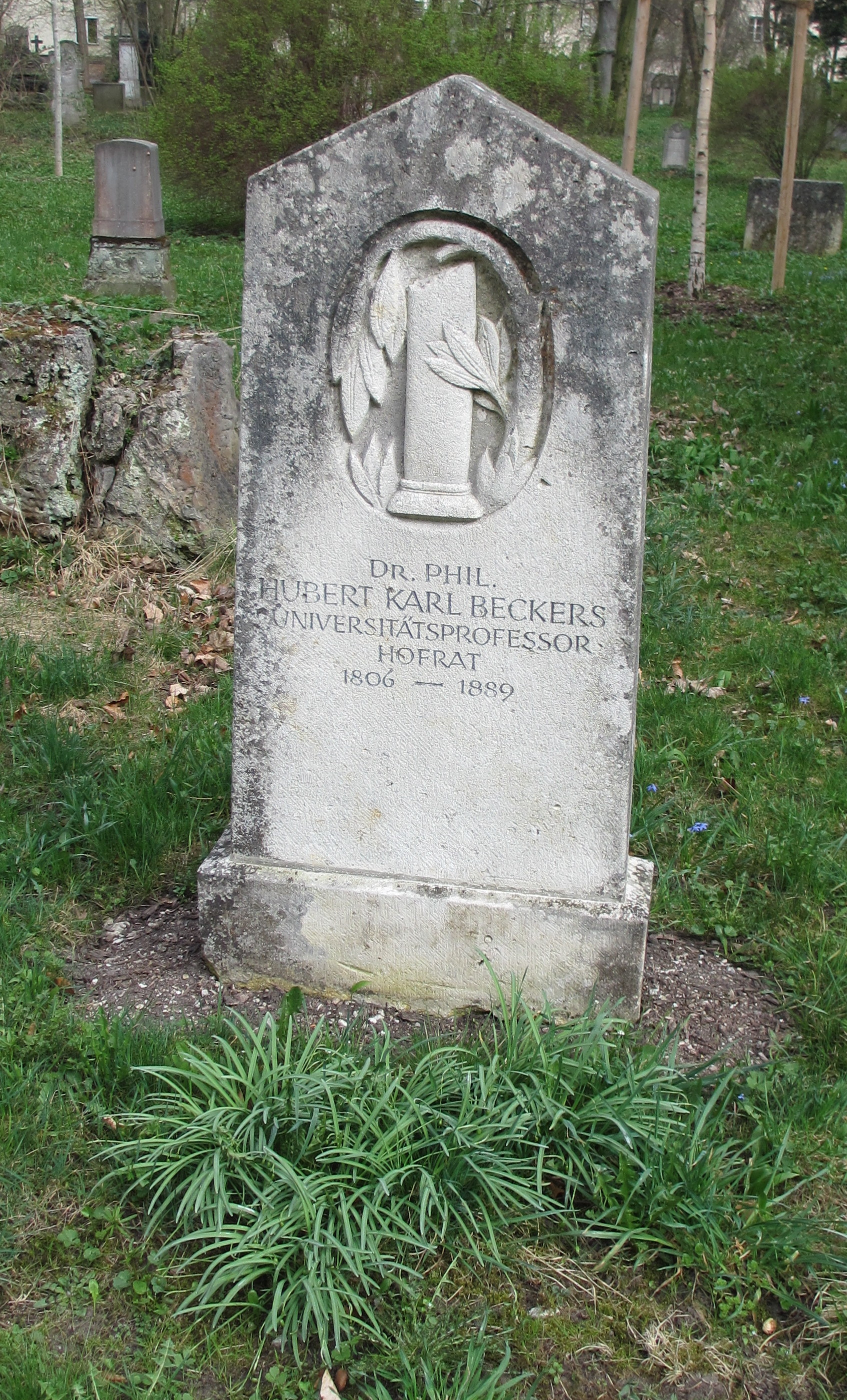
Grave of Hubert Beckers at Alter Südfriedhof in Munich

== Works ==
- Ueber das Wesen des Gefühles (1830) – On the essence of feeling.
- Cantica Spiritualia (Munich 1845–47).
- Denkrede auf Schelling (Munich 1855) – Commemorative address of Schelling.
- Ueber die Bedeutung der Schellingschen Metaphysik (Munich 1861) – On the significance of Schelling's metaphysics.
- Ueber die Wahre und Bleibende Bedeutung der Naturphilosophie Schelling's (1864) – On the true and lasting significance of Schelling's natural philosophy.
- Aphorismen über Tod und Unsterblichkeit (Munich 1889) – Aphorisms about death and immortality.
