= Anne M. Houtman =

American academic administrator

Anne M. Houtman is an American academic administrator who was the 20th president of Earlham College.
