= Jürgen B. Hausmann =

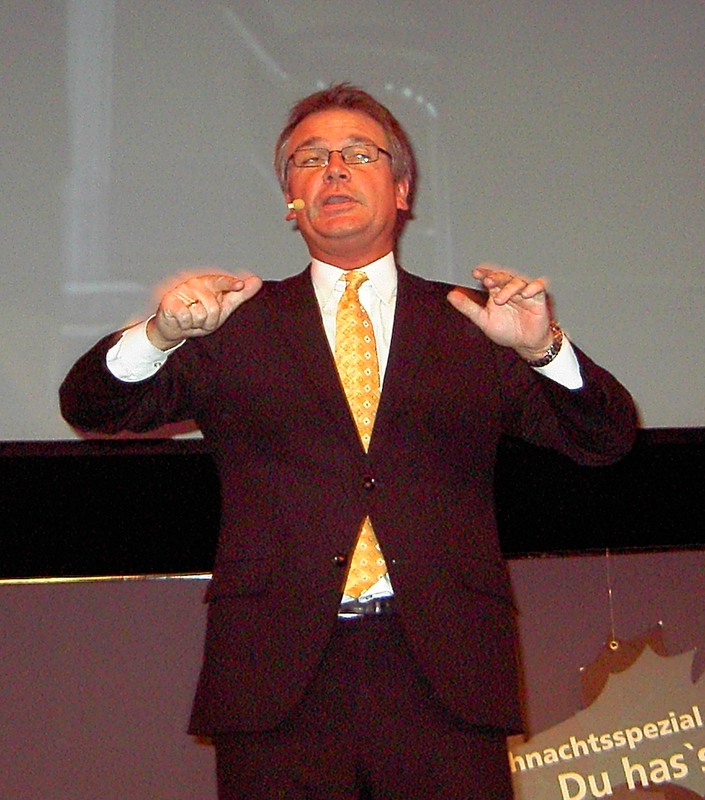
Jürgen B. Hausmann on stage

Jürgen B. Hausmann (born 29 October 1964, in Alsdorf) is the stage name of Jürgen Beckers, a prominent German cabaret performer and comedian.

Jürgen B. Hausmann is a teacher at a gymnasium in the city of Würselen near Aachen, educating his students in the Latin and Greek language as well as in history. As a boy he had his first humoristic performances at the Carnival. Since 1999 Jürgen B. Hausmann is known for his one-man-show on various stages throughout the Rhineland.
