= Agricola =

Agricola, the Latin word for farmer, may also refer to:

== People ==
=== Cognomen or given name ===
- Gnaeus Julius Agricola (40–93), Roman governor of Britannia (AD 77–85)
- Sextus Calpurnius Agricola, Roman governor of the mid–2nd century AD
- Agricola (consul 421) (born 365), Western Roman statesman
- Agricola (vir illustris) (fl. 466–485), son of the Western Roman Emperor Avitus
- Saints Vitalis and Agricola (died 304), martyrs
- Agricola of Avignon (c. 630 – c. 700), bishop of Avignon and saint
- Saint Agricola of Nevers (died 594), bishop of Nevers
- Agricola of Chalon-sur-Saône (died 580), bishop of Chalon-sur-Saône

=== Pen name ===
- John Young (merchant) (1773–1837), merchant, author and political figure in Nova Scotia who wrote under the name Agricola

=== Surname ===
- Adam Christian Agricola (1593–1645), evangelical preacher
- Alexander Agricola (1446–1506), Franco-Flemish composer of the Renaissance
- Christoph Ludwig Agricola (1667–1719), German landscape painter
- Georg Andreas Agricola (1672–1738), German physician and naturalist
- Georg Ludwig Agricola (1643–1676), German composer
- Georgius Agricola (1494–1555), German scholar and scientist, and the 'father of mineralogy'
- Ignaz Agricola (1661–1729), German Jesuit
- Ilka Agricola (born 1973), German mathematician
- Johann Friedrich Agricola (1720–1774), German composer
- Johannes Agricola (1494–1566), German scholar and theologian, an antinomian
- Karl Agricola (1779–1852), German painter
- Karol Ludwik Agricola (18th century), Polish engineer
- Kurt Agricola (1889–1955), German World War II general
- Martin Agricola (1486–1556), German composer and music theorist of the Renaissance
- Mikael Agricola (1510–1557), Finnish theologian and reformer
- Peter Agricola (1525–1585), German Renaissance humanist, educator, classical scholar, theologian and diplomat
- Philipp Agricola (fl. 1571–1594), German poet and dramatist
- Rodolphus Agricola (1443–1485), Dutch scholar and humanist
- Stephan Agricola, also Kastenpaur (1491–1547), German scholar and theologian, formerly an Augustinian friar

== Places in the United States ==
- Agricola, Florida, a former company town
- Agricola, Georgia, an unincorporated community
- Agricola, Kansas, an unincorporated community
- Agricola, Mississippi, an unincorporated community

== Other uses ==
- Agricola (surname)
- Agricola (book), a biography of Julius Agricola by Tacitus
- AGRICOLA, a database of scientific papers
- Agricola (vehicles), a Greek truck manufacturer
- Agricola (bird), a genus of birds
- Agricola (board game), a 2007 board game by Uwe Rosenberg
- 3212 Agricola, an asteroid
- Auster Agricola, an aircraft from the 1950s
- Agricola (school), a secret NCO school operated by the Grey Ranks during World War II
- Agricola Street, a prominent street in the neighbourhood of North End in Halifax, Nova Scotia
- Agricola Park, an urban park in Warsaw, Poland
- Agrykola Street, a street in Warsaw, Poland
- A series of commemorative medals issued by the Food and Agriculture Organization.

== See also ==
- Agricola's Ditch
