= Tadeusz Mazowiecki Park (Warsaw) =

Urban park in Warsaw, Poland

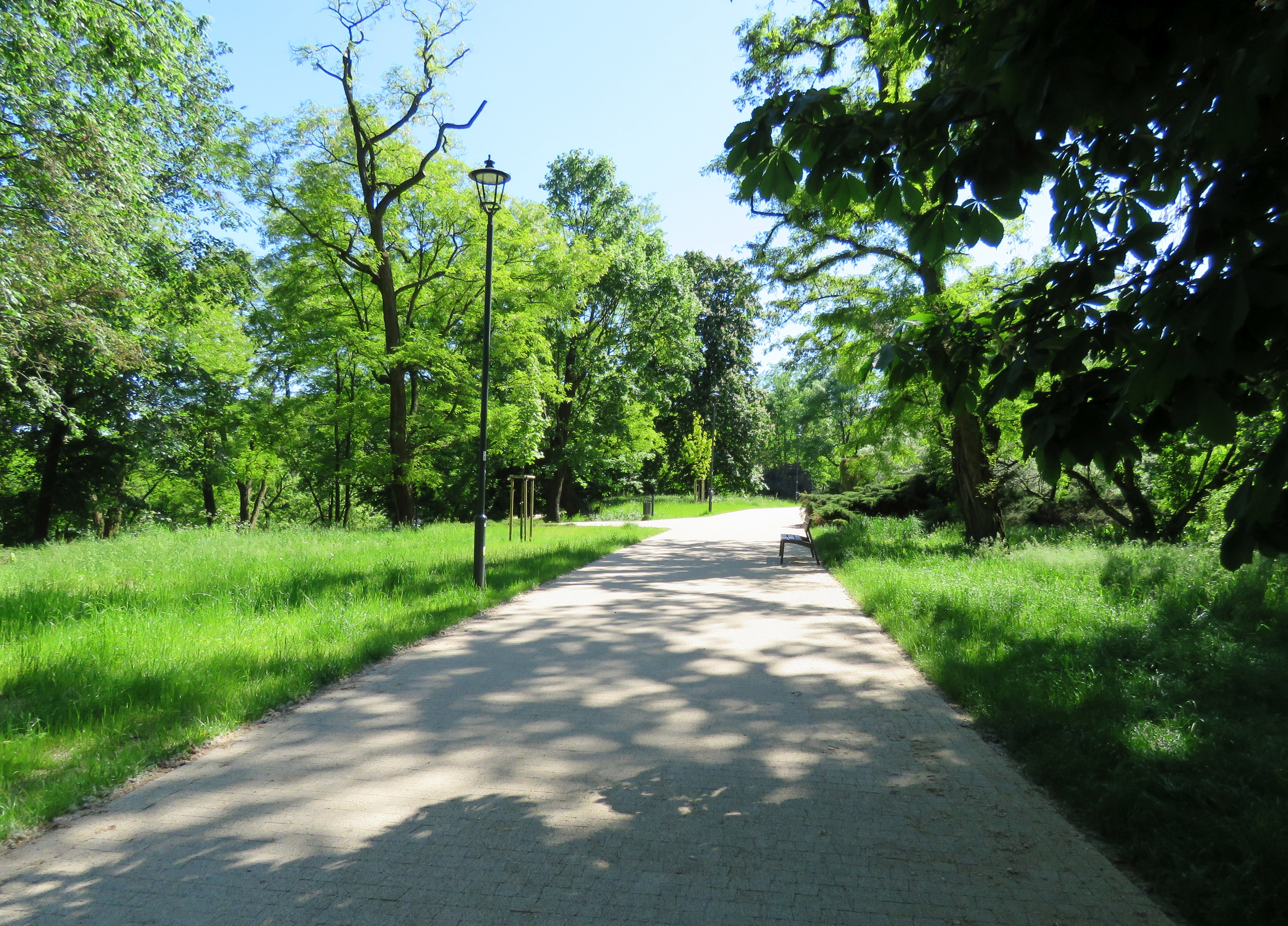
- The Tomasz Mazowiecki Park in 2017.
- Interactive map of Tadeusz Mazowiecki Park
- Type: Urban park
- Location: Warsaw, Poland
- Coordinates: 52°13′23″N 21°01′53″E
- Area: 5.7 hectares (14 acres)

The Tadeusz Mazowiecki Park, (Note: Polish: Park Tadeusza Mazowieckiego, pronounced [ˈpark tadɛˈuʂa mazɔvjɛt͡sˈkʲɛɡɔ].) formerly known as the Jazdów Park, (Note: Polish: Park Jazdów, pronounced [park ˈjazduf].) is an urban park in Warsaw, Poland, located in the district of Downtown.

== Name ==
It was originally named after the nearby neighbourhood of Jazdów and Jazdów Street. On 18 April 2018, the park was renamed to Tadeusz Mazowiecki Park, after Tadeusz Mazowiecki, the first Prime Minister of the Third Polish Republic, from 1989 to 1991.

== Characteristics ==
The park has an irregular shape, and is located between Myśliwiecka Street, Górnośląska Street, People's Army Avenue, and buildings near the Jazdów Street.

It borders the Marshal Edward Rydz-Śmigły Park to the north, and the Agricola Park to the south, and is connected to the Ujazdów Park via a pathway to the east.
