= Saint Agricola =

Saint Agricola may refer to:

- Agricola a Roman martyr saint of the 4th century
- Agricola of Avignon a 7th century bishop
- Agricola of Chalon-sur-Saône a 6th century bishop
- Agricola of Nevers a 6th century bishop
