= Petrus Särkilahti =

Petrus Särkilahti (a.k.a. Pietari Särkilahti, sometimes written as Petrus Saerkilahti; died 1529) was a Finnish student of Martin Luther and one of the early pioneers of teaching science in the Finnish language. He spread the idea of the religious Reformation eagerly.

In Turku, Finland, Särkilahti met Mikael Agricola, who became his student. In 1538, the first known books written entirely in Finnish were published by Agricola. Agricola therefore became called by many the father of the written Finnish language.
