= 3212 Agricola =

Main-belt asteroid

Discovery
- Discovered by: Y. Väisälä
- Discovery site: Turku Obs.
- Discovery date: 19 February 1938

Designations
- Pronunciation: /əˈɡrɪkələ/
- Named after: Mikael Agricola (reformer)
- Alternative designations: 1938 DH_{2} · 1982 BB_{2}
- Minor planet category: main-belt · Flora

Orbital characteristics
- Epoch 4 September 2017 (JD 2458000.5)
- Uncertainty parameter 0
- Observation arc: 78.37 yr (28,626 days)
- Aphelion: 2.5980 AU
- Perihelion: 1.9148 AU
- Semi-major axis: 2.2564 AU
- Eccentricity: 0.1514
- Orbital period (sidereal): 3.39 yr (1,238 days)
- Mean anomaly: 180.14°
- Mean motion: 0° 17^{m} 26.88^{s} / day
- Inclination: 7.8102°
- Longitude of ascending node: 109.97°
- Argument of perihelion: 35.064°

Physical characteristics
- Dimensions: 4.442±0.287 km 5.41 km (calculated)
- Synodic rotation period: 9 h (Note: Pravec (2006) web: rotation period 9 hours with a brightness amplitude of 0.07 mag. Summary figures for (3212) Agricola at www.asu.cas.cz/~ppravec/neo.htm Pravec, P.; Wolf, M.; Sarounova, L. (2006) and Collaborative Asteroid Lightcurve Link (CALL))
- Geometric albedo: 0.24 (assumed); 0.391±0.070
- Spectral type: S
- Absolute magnitude (H): 13.6 · 13.4 · 13.38±0.52 · 13.5

3212 Agricola, provisional designation 1938 DH_{2}, is a stony Flora asteroid from the inner regions of the asteroid belt, approximately 5 km (3.1 miles) in diameter. It was discovered by Finnish astronomer Yrjö Väisälä at Turku Observatory in Southwest Finland, on 19 February 1938, and named after reformer Mikael Agricola.

== Orbit and classification ==
The S-type asteroid is a member of the Flora family, one of the largest groups of stony asteroids in the main-belt. It orbits the Sun in the inner main-belt at a distance of 1.9–2.6 AU once every 3 years and 5 months (1,238 days). Its orbit has an eccentricity of 0.15 and an inclination of 8° with respect to the ecliptic.

== Physical characteristics ==
A rotational lightcurve obtained from photometric observations by Czech astronomer Petr Pravec in May 2006, rendered a period of 9 hours with a brightness variation of 0.07 in magnitude (U=n/a). According to the survey carried out by the NEOWISE mission of NASA's space-based Wide-field Infrared Survey Explorer, the asteroid measures 4.4 km (2.7 miles) in diameter, and its surface has a high albedo of 0.39, while the Collaborative Asteroid Lightcurve Link assumes an intermediate albedo of 0.24 – derived from 8 Flora, the largest member and namesake of this orbital family – and calculates a larger diameter of 5.4 km (3.4 miles).

== Naming ==
This minor planet was named in honor of Finnish clergyman Mikael Agricola (c. 1510–1557), bishop and reformer of Finland, often called "father of Finnish literature". He published his Abckiria, the first book printed in the Finnish language, and translated the New Testament into Finnish. The official naming citation was published by the Minor Planet Center on 27 June 1991 (M.P.C. 18450).
