= Georg Andreas Agricola =

German physician and botanist (1672–1738)

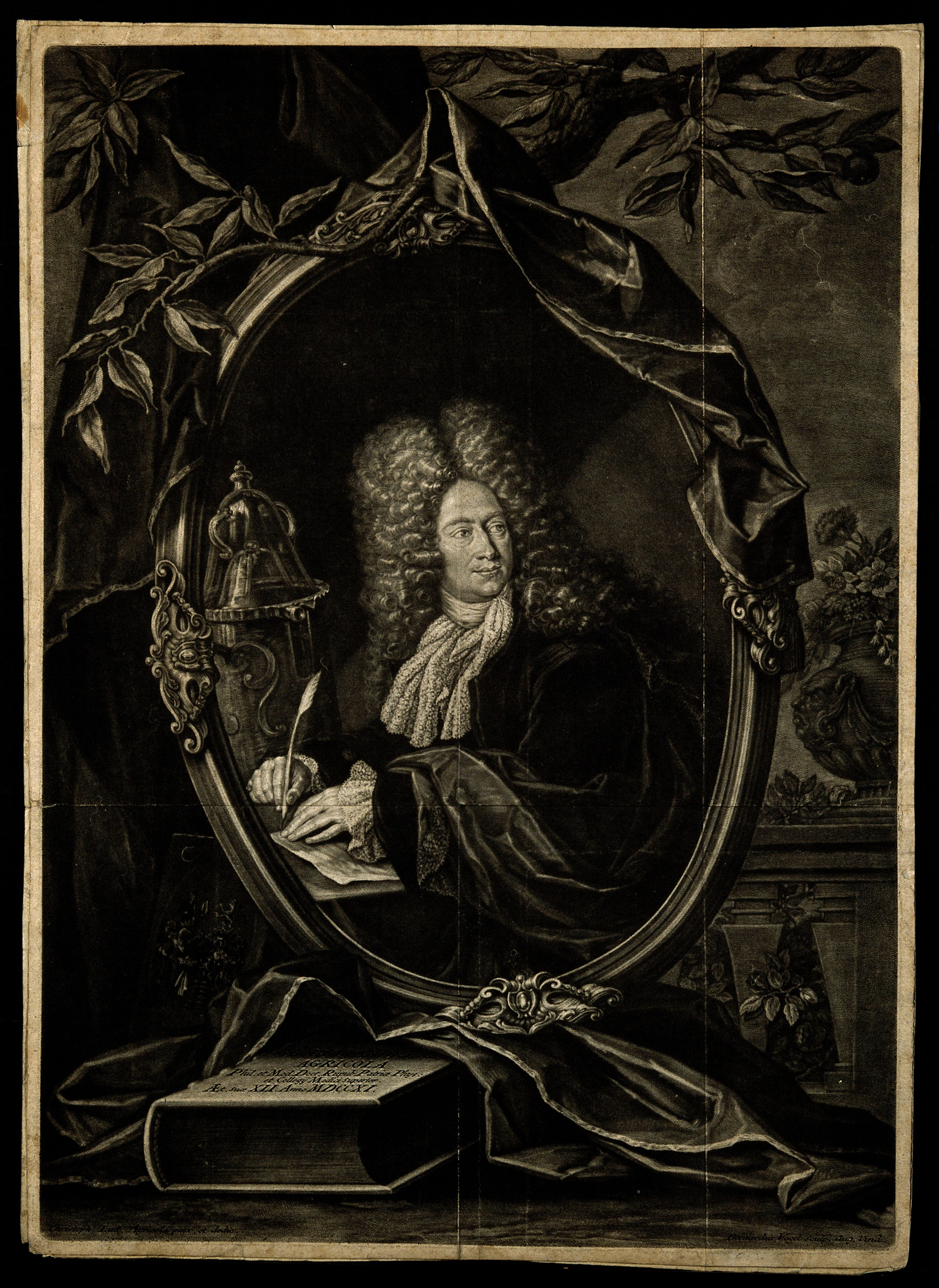
Portrait of Georg Andreas Agricola

Georg Andreas Agricola or Georgio Andrea Agricola or Georg Andreas Bauer or George André Agricola (/əˈɡrɪkələ/; 1672–1738) was a German physician and botanist from Regensburg.

== Career ==
Agricola studied at Regensburg and graduated from University of Halle-Wittenberg as a Doctor of Medicine. He practiced medicine at Regensburg.

Agricola experimented with plant cuttings and grafting. He provided useful advice on plant propagation, multiplying plants from sections of roots or branches. He discovered ways of grafting several species of fruit tree onto one, thereby producing a tree bearing different types of fruit. He compiled these techniques in his book, The Experimental Husbandman and Gardener, which was first published in German in 1716. It was then translated into English by Richard Bradley in 1726. His book on the subject of grafting enjoyed an enthusiastic reception in the horticultural and botanical world, was promptly translated into Dutch, French, and English after its appearance and served as the definitive work on fruit-tree propagation for many decades after.

In 1699, he was elected to the Royal Academy.

== English Translations ==
- Bradley, Richard A philosophical treatise of husbandry and gardening : being a new method of cultivating and increasing all sorts of trees, shrubs, and flowers. A Very Curious work: Containing many Useful Secrets in Nature, for helping the Vegetation of Trees and Plants, and for fertilising the most Stubborn Soils. By G.A. Agricola, M.D. and Doctor in Philosophy at Ratisbonne. Translated from the High-Dutch, with Remarks: and Adorn'd with Cuts. The whole revised and Compared with the Original, together with a Preface, confirming this New Method, by Richard Bradley, Fellow of the Royal Society. London: P. Vaillant, 1721 ESTC # T042266 Gale document # CW109618793 Google Books Gale Eighteenth Century Collections Online (subscription database) Public database: (Translation of the 2 published volumes of "Neu- und nie erhörter..." see first item under bibliography)
- Bradley, Richard The experimental husbandman and gardener: containing a new method of improving estates and gardens, By Cultivating and Increasing of Forrest-Trees, Coppice-Woods, Fruit-Trees, Shrubs, Flowers and Greenhouses, and Exotick Plants, after several Manners; viz. by Layers, Cuttings, Roots, Leaves, &c. With Great Variety of New Discoveries relating to Graffing, Terebration or Boreing, Inarching, Emplastration, and Inoculation; of Reversing of Trees, and Digesting their Juices to bring them to bear Fruit. With several New Experiments for the Fertilizing of Stubborn Soils. By G.A. Agricola, M.D. Translated from the original, with remarks: and adorn'd with cuts. The second edition. To which is now added, an appendix, containing a Variety of Experiments lately practised upon the above System, By R. Bradley, Professor of Botany at Cambridge, and F. R. S, Translator Richard Bradley, W. Mears, and F. Clay, 1726 ESTC # T082177 Gale document # CW109840072 Google Books HathiTrust Gale Eighteenth Century Collections Online (subscription database) Public database: Gale The Making of the Modern World (subscription database) Public database: (The second edition of Richard Bradley's translation of "Neu- und nie erhörter..." with "an appendix, containing a Variety of Experiments lately practised upon the above System")

== Bibliography ==
- Neu- und nie erhörter doch in der Natur und Vernunfft wohlgegründeter Versuch der Universal-Vermehrung aller Bäume, Stauden, und Blumen-Gewächse Regensburg (1716–1717) Dutchess Anna Amalia Library Monographien Digital Volumes 1–2: Bavarian State Library digital Volume 1: Volume 2: Google Books Volumes 1–2: Volume 1: Volume 2: Gale The Making of the Modern World (subscription database) Volumes 1–2: Public database: (The two published volumes of "Neu- und nie erhörter..."; see 4th item under bibliography "Versuch einer allgemeinen vermehrung..." for a 1772 reprint of the 2 published volumes with notes by Christoph Gottlieb Brauser)
  - Non-English translations:
    - L'agriculture parfaite ou Nouvelle découverte, touchant la culture et la multiplication des arbres, des arbustes et des fleurs. Pierre De Coup, 1720 Google Books Volume 1: Volume 2: Volumes 1–2: The Internet Archive & Biodiversity Heritage Library Volumes 1–2: National Horticultural Society of France Volume 1: Volume 2: Bavarian State Library digital Volume 1: Volume 2:
    - Nieuwe En Ongehoorde Dog in de Natuur welgegronde Queek-Konst Van Boomen, Heesters En Bloemgewassen, Ofte derselver Algemeene Vermeerdering: Behelfende Hoedanig men allerley Bomen, door in stukken gesnedene Wortels, Stammen, Takken, Ja selfs door Bladeren. Isaac le Long, De Coup, 1719 Google Books Volumes 1–2: Volume 1: Volume 2: Bavarian State Library digital Volume 1: Volume 2:
- Versuch einer allgemeinen vermehrung aller bäume, stauden und blumengewächse, theoretisch und practisch vorgetragen ... anjetzo auf ein neues übersehen, mit anmerkungen und einer vorrede begleitet durch Christoph Gottlieb Brausern ... HathiTrust Gale The Making of the Modern World (subscription database) Volume 1: Volume 2: Public database: Volumes 1–2: (1772 reprint of the 2 published volumes of "Neu- und nie erhörter..." with notes by Christoph Gottlieb Brauser)
- D. Georgii Andreae Agricolae ... Verzeichniß Derer Capitel Seines Dritten Theils, Handelnd von der Wahrheit und Beständigkeit Der Universal-Vermehrung aller Bäume, Stauden, und Blumen-Gewächse Saxon State Library Digital Collections (The table of contents of a 3rd unpublished volume of "Neu- und nie erhörter...")
- Gründliche Wiederlegung, An statt der Duplic, Betreffend Die boßhafftige Wieder-Antwort Des Tit. Herrn Friedrich Küffners, Pfarrers zu Leichtenberg, Sammt einer Nachdrücklichen Vermahnung, 1718 Google Books Bavarian State Library digital Saxon State Library Digital Collections
- Entdeckte neu-erfundene Kunst Von der Universal-Vermehrung Aller Baum- Und Stauden-Gewächs, [et]c. Google Books Bavarian State Library digital Saxon State Library Digital Collections
- Verzeichnüs Der vermehrten Physicalischen Garten-Proben, Welche in diesem 1717den und nachfolgendem... Saxon State Library Digital Collections
- Prodromus Agricolae, Non-Agricolae Oder Kurtzer Vorbeweiß, wie künfftig weitläufftiger solle dargethan werden, daß Tit. Herr Georg Andreas Agricola ... Derjenige nicht seye, der Er seyn will Google Books Saxon State Library Digital Collections Bavarian State Library digital
- Gemüßigte Wieder-Antwort auf die mit vielen Verfälschungen, Verdrehungen Injurien und Voreiligkeiten angefüllte Gegen-Antwort des Tit. Herrn Georgii Andreae Agricola Phil. & Med. Doct. & Physici in Regenspurg Saxon State Library Digital Collections
- Verzeichniß aller Physicalischen Garten-Proben, welche in diesem 1717den Jahre von Herrn Georg Andreas Agricola ... nach seinem ... Wercke, Von dem Versuch der Universal-Vermehrung aller Bäume und Stauden-Gewächse, Wie sie der Autor theoretice ... beschrieben, practice experimentiret und gemachet werden; Damit auch andere Garten-Liebhaber sich nach demselben richten ... können Saxon State Library Digital Collections
- Abgedrungene Gegen-Antwort auff die Ehrenrührige, nachtheilige und gantz verdrehte Antwort, welche in der Vorrede des (Tit.) Hn. Friderich Küffners, Pfarrers zu Lichtenberg, andern Theils der Bau-Kunst befindlich Saxon State Library Digital Collections
- Copia des Eröffneten Geheimnüß Herrn Georg Andreä Agricolae ... Von der neu- und höchst-nutzbaren Universal-Vermehrung aller Bäume- und Stauden-Gewächse Google Books Saxon State Library Digital Collections Göttinger Digitalisierungszentrum
- Copia eines Schreibens von Sr. Hoch-Gräfl. Gnaden und Excellenz Herrn Joseph Oßwald Grafen von Attempts ... An Herrn Georg Andream Agricolam ... Stadt-Physikum in Regenspurg, Die Universal-Vermehrung der Bäume und Stauden-Gewächse betreffend Saxon State Library Digital Collections
- Georg. Andr. Agricolae ... Nachricht Von seiner erfundenen höchst nutzbaren Universal-Vermehrung aller Bäume und Stauden-Gewächse, Vermittelst welcher ein Liebhaber in weniger Zeit durchs gantze Jahr seine Kunst- und Obst-Gärten, auch Wälder, nach Belieben vermehren kann; Nebst einer Probe von diesem Wunder-Geheimnüsse Saxon State Library Digital Collections Göttinger Digitalisierungszentrum
- Joh. Andr. Agricolae ... Nachricht Von seiner erfundenen höchstnutzbaren Universal-Vermehrung aller Bäume und Stauden-Gewächse. Vermittelst welcher ein Liebhaber in weniger Zeit durchs gantze Jahr seine Kunst- und Obst-Gärten, auch Wälder, nach Belieben vermehren kann; Nebst einer Probe von diesem Wunder-Geheimnüsse Saxon State Library Digital Collections
- Gespräch Eines guten Freunds Mit einem undanckbahren Schüler in der Schweitz, betreffend die Publication Der unvollkommenen Copiae Des Eröffneten Geheimnüß Tit. Hn. Georg Andreä Agricolä ... Von der neu- und höchst-nutzbaren Universal-Vermehrung aller Bäume und Stauden-Gewächse Saxon State Library Digital Collections
- Kurtzer Bericht von dem Ursprunge der neu- und höchst-nutzbaren Universal-Vermehrung aller Bäume und Stauden-Gewächse des Georg Andreä Agricolä Saxon State Library Digital Collections Göttinger Digitalisierungszentrum
- Kurtzer Bericht von dem Ursprunge der neu- und höchstnutzbaren Universal-Vermehrung aller Bäume und Stauden-Gewächse des Georg Andreä Agricolä Saxon State Library Digital Collections
- Wahre Nachricht von dem Neuangelegten und nach der Natur verfertigten Sonn- und Stern-Wald, Wie solcher nach dem Versuch der neuerfundenen Universal-Vermehrung Aller Bäume und Stauden-Gewächse, Vermittelst der verstürtzten Plantage, sich praesentiret, Und auff eine leere Stätte ... ein und eine halbe Stunde von Regenspurg von Herrn Doctor Andrea Agricola ... ist angeleget worden den 12. Juni 1717; Mit darzu dienlichem curieusen Kupffer Saxon State Library Digital Collections
- Christ-Brüderliche unpartialische Remarquen über das neu höchst nutzbare Bäum- und Stauden-Gewächse universale Vermehrungs-Menstruum des hochgelehrten Philosophi und Doctoris Medicinae, Tit. Herrn Georgii Andreae Agricolae ... Saxon State Library Digital Collections
- Joh. Andr. Agricolae ... Nachricht Von seiner erfundenen höchstnutzbaren Universal-Vermehrung aller Bäume und Stauden-Gewächse Saxon State Library Digital Collections
- Wahre Assecuration oder Versicherung des Erfinders der neu- und höchst-nutzbahren Universal-Vermehrung aller Bäume- Stauden- und Blumen-Gewächse an die hochgeschätzten Garten-Liebhaber, welche in des Inventoris Albo befindlich Saxon State Library Digital Collections
- Kurtze doch treuhertzige Ermahnung An alle diejenigen, So das Exemplar, welches in Franckfurt und Leipzig soll gedrucket seyn, da man doch aus vielen Kennzeichen erweisen kan, daß solches in einer benachbarten Reichs-Stadt ausgegangen, und öffentlich verkauffet und verschicket wird, darinner die entdeckte neu-erfundene Kunst Von der Universal-Vermehrung Aller Bäume und Stauden-Gewächse befindlich seyn soll, empfangen Saxon State Library Digital Collections
- Kurtze Einleitung, Wie man nach dem Versuch der Neu-erfundenen Universal-Vermehrung Aller Bäume und Stauden-Gewächse Vermittelst Der verstürtzten Plantage Die ausgehauene Wälder und andere leere Stäte schnel ... ersetzen kann, so daß sie noch in diesem Jahr austrieben und Wurtzeln schlagen können Saxon State Library Digital Collections
- Kurtz-gefaßtes Send-Schreiben An Alle Hohe und Niedrige Garten-Patronen, die in meinem Albo befindlich, Betreffend den ... Ersten Theil des Neu- und nie-erhörten, Doch in der Natur und Vernunfft wohlgegründeten Versuchs der Universal-Vermehrung Aller Bäume- Stauden- und Blumen-Gewächse Saxon State Library Digital Collections
- Oeffentliche Declaration, Wie es der Inventor mit der Publication der neu- und nie erhörten Universal-Vermehrung aller Bäume u. Stauden-gewächß beständig gehalten haben will : Wie er solches Allen und jeden, welche Land-Güter und Gärten besitzen, oder Liebhaber der Obst-Bäume und fruchtbaren Stauden-Gewächse sind, kund und zu wissen gemacht. Saxon State Library Digital Collections
- Catalogus Experimentorum Physicorum hortensium, das ist: Physicalische Garten-Proben, Welche Nach den Versuchen der Universal-Vermehrung aller Bäume und Stauden-Gewächse, wie sie der Autor theoretice in denen zwey Theilen in folio beschrieben, anjetzo aber practice von ihm selbst experimentiret und gemachet werden. Regensburg : Hofmann, 1717. Saxon State Library Digital Collections
- Darinnen Noch unterschiedliche neu-erfundene Versuche, welche in dem Ersten Theile, wegen vieler Occupationen und Kürtze der Zeit, zurücke geblieben. Leipzig : Selbstverl., 1717. Bavarian State Library digital

=== Earlier work ===
- Agricola, Georg Andreas (1695). Als Unter dem ansehnlichen Rectorat Des ... Herrn Georg Michael Hebers ... Dem ... Herrn Georg Andr. Agricolae, Regensp. Medicinae Studios. Die Wohlverdiente Magister-Würde Auff dem weltberühmten Elb-Athen Den 15. Octobris, 1695. rühmligst beygeleget wurde, Legten Ihre schuldige gratulation ab Ihr Excellentz Hn. Prof. Dassovii, Sämtliche Tisch-Genossen. Wittenberg: Schultz. Bavarian State Library digital

=== Coauthorships ===
- Johann Friedrich, Leopold; Georg Andreas Agricola. Johan. Friderici Leopold, M.D. Relatio epistolica de itinere suo Suecico anno MDCCVII facto ad ... Johannem Woodward. Londinium : apud Timoth. Childe, 1720. Gale Eighteenth Century Collections Online (subscription database)
- Agricola, Georg Andreas; Prinz. Savoyen-Carignan Eugen; Römisch-Deutsches Reich Kaiser Karl VI. Illuminatio votiva, welche Ihro ... Maj. Carolo VI. wegen des ... Sieges unter ... Anführung des ... Printz Eugenii von Savoyen ... wie auch wegen der Eroberung der ... Vestung Belgrad ... in drey grossen Bildern und zwey Pyramiden ... praesentirt worden, die 30. Sept. Anno 1717. Regenspurg, 1717. Saxon State Library Digital Collections
- Thomae, Nicolas Agricola, Georg Andreas De Inventione Novae Plantationis Et Multiplicationis Plantarum, Ingratiam Excellentissimi, Doctissimi Et Expertissimi Domini Medici, Et Huius Lib. Ac Imperialis Civitatis Ratisbonensis Physici &c. Domini Agricolae Inventoris 1716 Saxon State Library Digital Collections
- Georg Andreas AGRICOLA; Friedrich HOFFMANN, of Halle the Younger Salubritatem fluxus hæmorrhoidalis, sub præsidio ... Friderici Hoffmanni ... dissertationi inaugurali deducebat M. G. A. Agricola Halle, 1708. University and State Library of Saxony-Anhalt

==== Earlier work ====
- Bergerus, Johannes Gothofredus; Georg Andreas Agricola De Succi Nutricii Per Nervos Transitu, Praesidio Jo. Gothofredi Bergeri, D. Ordinis Medici Senioris, & Pathologiae Prof. Publ. ... disseret Georg. Andreas Agricola, Ratisponens. A. D. XIX. Ianuar. A. MDCXCV. H.L.Q.S. Vitembergae : Schrödterus Wittenberg, 1695. GBV Common Library Network Google Books Bavarian State Library digital University and State Library of Saxony-Anhalt
- Friedrich, Hoffmann; Georg Andreas Agricola Disputatio medica inauguralis, de Salubritate Fluxus Haemorrhoidalis, quam ... Halae Magdeb. : Lit. Chr. Henckelii, 1697. Google Books Saxon State Library Digital Collections Bavarian State Library digital

=== Works which may not have been digitised ===
==== Coauthorships ====
- Becher, Johann Joachim; Georg Christoph Becher; Richard Lower; Georg Andreas Agricola Johann Joachim Bechers kluger Haus-Vater, verständige Haus-Mutter, vollkommener Land-Medicus, wie auch wohlerfahrner Ross- und Viehe-Artzt : nebenst einem deutlichen und gewissen Handgriff, die Haushaltungs-Kunst innerhab 24. Stunden zu erlernen, also, dass man mit Ersparung grosser Unkosten, solche Nahrung glücklich fortsetzen, sich vor Kranckheiten bewahren, auch vermittelst eines geringen Capitals von 365. Thl. jährlichen mit gutem Gewissen und ohne schändlichem Wucher 1000. Thl. profitiren könne, welchem anietzo noch beygefüget des edlen Weidmanns geheimes Jäger-Cabinet, wie auch einige nützliche und nöthige Rechts, und andere Formularien, mit Kön. Pol. und Churfürstl. Sächs. Privilegio. Leipzig : Verlegts Jacob Schuster, 1738.
- Johann Christian Lehmann; J Le Long; Georg Andreas Agricola Algemeene vermeerdering van alle boom en heester-gewassen or Nieuwe volmaakte bloem-thuyn, in de winter : of wonderbaare en nooyt voor deesen bekende bloemqueekerey-konst, om midden in de winter ... een volmaakte bloem-thuyn te hebben, even als midden in de somer. T'Amsterdam : By Samuel Schoonwald, 1718.
