= Philipp Agricola =

German poet and dramatist

Philipp Agricola (fl. 1571–1594) was a German poet and dramatist.

Agricola was born in Eisleben, and is assumed to have been the son of Johannes Agricola. He was in Berlin by 1571, where he wrote poetry and dramas about Brandenburg's ruling family; his drama Jüngste Gericht (1573) satirized the Junkers and court clergy. He was active in Berlin until at least 1594.
