= Karol Ludwik Agricola =

18th-century engineer

- Military career
- Allegiance: Polish–Lithuanian Commonwealth
- Branch: Crown Army
- Rank: Lieutenant colonel
- Unit: Crown Engineering Corps

Karol Ludwik Agricola (Polish: [ˈka.rɔl ˈlu.dvik a.ɡriˈkɔ.la]) was an 18th-century engineer, and the head constructor in the royal court of Stanisław August Poniatowski, monarch of the Polish–Lithuanian Commonwealth. He is best known for designing and supervising the construction of the artificial ponds and canals of the Royal Baths Park in Warsaw, Poland.

== Biography ==
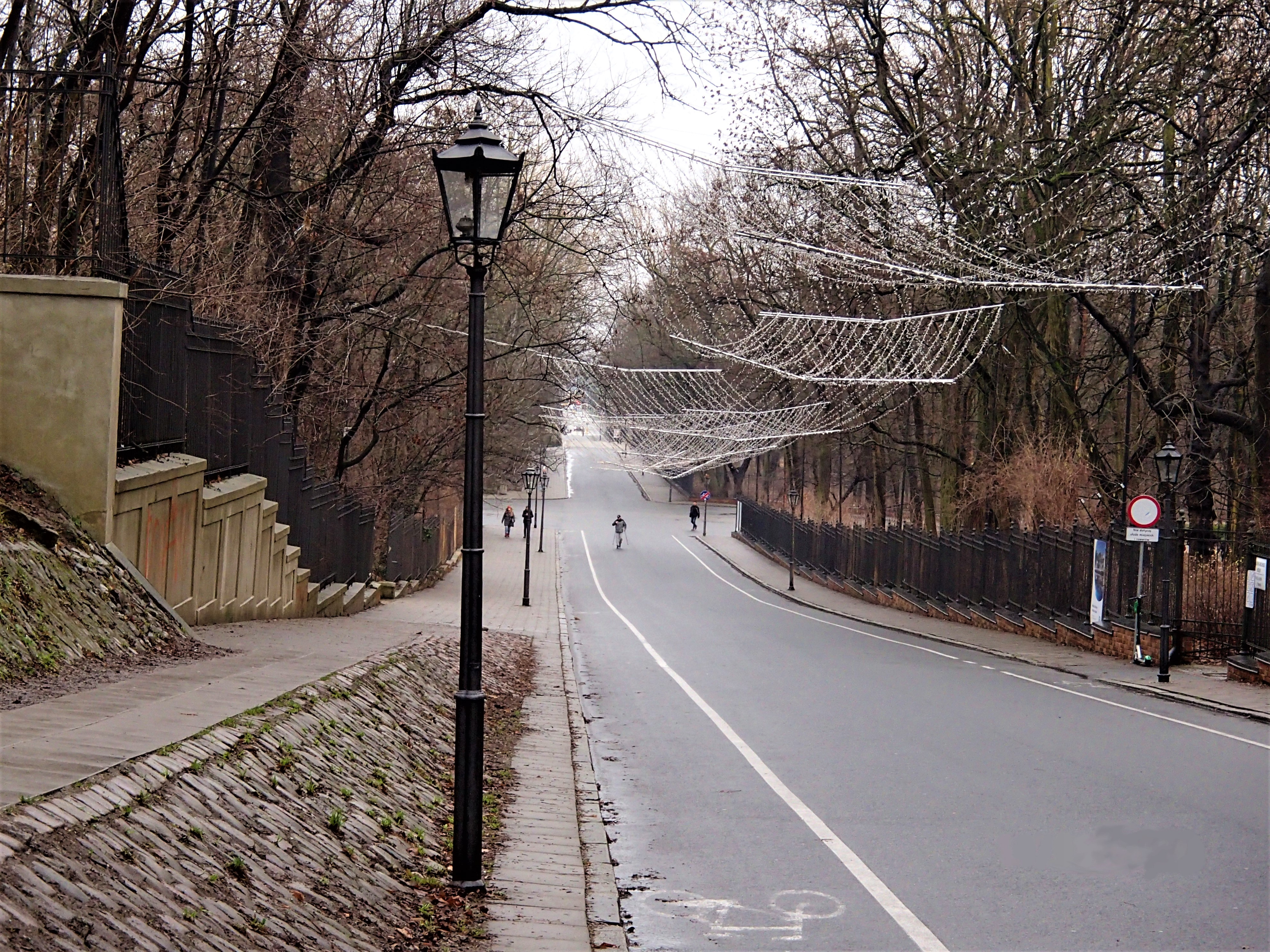
Agrykola Street in Warsaw, Poland, which was designed by, and named after Karol Ludwik Agricola.

Karol Ludwik Agricola was an 18th-century engineer, and a lieutenant colonel in the Crown Engineering Corps of the Crown Army of the Polish–Lithuanian Commonwealth. He was also the head constructor in the royal court of Stanisław August Poniatowski.

He worked on the hydraulic engineering projects, including water canals and farming irrigation systems in Warsaw. From 1773 to 1779, he designed and oversaw construction of the artificial ponds and canals of the Royal Baths Park in Warsaw, and the nearby Agrykola Street.

== Commemorations ==
After him were named Agrykola Street, which he designed, and the nearby Agricola Park, both located in Warsaw, Poland.
