= Mikael Agricola =

Finnish clergyman and the official founder of literary Finnish (c. 1510-1557)

The Right Reverend Mikael Agricola
- Bishop of Turku
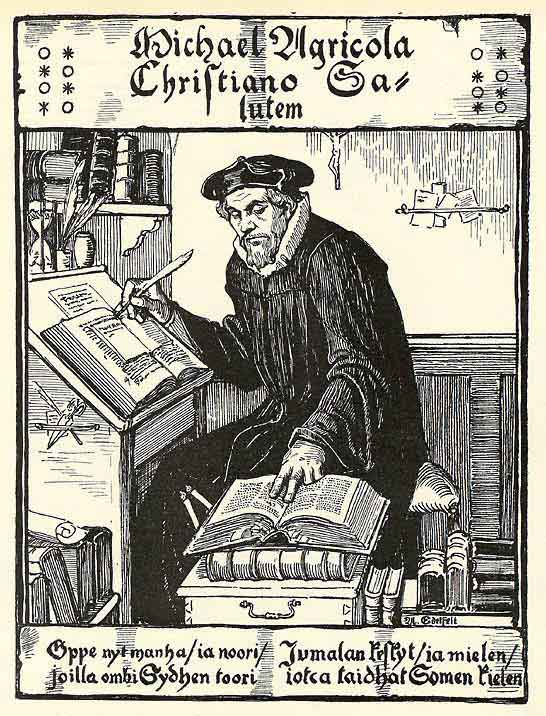
- Drawing of Mikael Agricola by Albert Edelfelt (1854–1900). No contemporary depictions of Agricola have survived.
- Church: Church of Sweden
- Diocese: Turku
- In office: 1554–1557
- Predecessor: Martti Skytte
- Successor: Petrus Follingius

Orders
- Ordination: 1531
- Consecration: 1554 by Botvid Sunesson

Personal details
- Born: c. 1510 Torsby, Pernå, Uusimaa (Nyland), Kalmar Union (now Finland)
- Died: 9 April 1557 (aged 46–47) Uusikirkko, Karelia, Sweden (now Russia)
- Denomination: Lutheran

Mikael Agricola (Finnish: [ˈmikɑel ˈɑɡrikolɑ]; c. 1510 – 9 April 1557) was a Finnish Lutheran clergyman who became the de facto founder of literary Finnish and a prominent proponent of the Protestant Reformation in Sweden, including Finland, which was a Swedish territory at the time. He is often called the "father of literary Finnish".

Agricola was consecrated as the bishop of Turku (Åbo) in 1554, without papal approval. He continued the reform of the Finnish church (then a part of the Church of Sweden) along Lutheran lines. He translated the New Testament into Finnish and also produced the prayer book and hymns used in Finland's new Lutheran Church. This work set the rules of orthography that are the basis of modern Finnish spelling. His thorough work is particularly remarkable in that he accomplished it in only three years.

He died of sudden illness while returning from a trip during which he assisted in negotiating the Treaty of Novgorod with the Tsardom of Russia.

== Biography ==
=== Early life ===
Michael Olaui or Mikael Olofsson (Finnish Mikael Olavinpoika) was born in c. 1510 in the village of Torsby in Pernå (Pernaja), Nyland (Uusimaa), in what now is part of Finland but then was part of Sweden. He was named after the patron saint of Pernå's church. The exact date of his birth, like most details of his life, is unknown. His family was a quite wealthy gentry family according to the local bailiff's accounting. He had three sisters, but their names are not known. His teachers apparently recognized his aptitude for languages and his rector Bartholomeus sent him to Viborg (Fi. Viipuri; now Vyborg, Russia) for Latin school and some priestly training, where he attended the school of Erasmus. It is not known whether his first language was Finnish or Swedish. Pernå was mostly a Swedish-speaking district, but the language he used in his works indicates that he was a native speaker of Finnish. However, he mastered both languages like a native speaker and was possibly a bilingual child.

=== Studies ===
When Michael studied in Viborg (Viipuri) he assumed the surname Agricola ("farmer" gv. "agriculture"); surnames based on one's father's status and occupation were common for first-generation scholars at the time. It was probably in Viipuri where he first came in touch with the Reformation and Humanism. The Viipuri castle was ruled by a German count, Johann, who had served the king of Sweden, Gustav Vasa. The count was a supporter of the Reformation, and they already held Lutheran services.

In 1528 Agricola followed his teacher to Turku (Åbo), then the center of the Finnish side of the Swedish realm and the capital of the bishopric. There Agricola became a scribe in bishop Martinus Skytte's office. While in Turku Agricola met Martin Luther's first Finnish student Petrus Särkilahti, who eagerly spread the idea of the Reformation. Särkilahti died in 1529, and it was up to Agricola to continue Särkilahti's work. Agricola was ordained for priesthood in Turku sometime in the early 1530s.

In 1536 the bishop of Turku sent Agricola to study in Wittenberg in Germany. He concentrated on the lectures of Philipp Melanchthon, who was an expert in Greek. In Wittenberg Agricola studied under Luther. Agricola got recommendations to Swedish King Gustav Vasa from both of the reformers. He sent two letters to Gustav, asking for a confirmation for a stipend. When the confirmation came, Agricola bought books (for example, the complete works of Aristotle). In 1538 he started translating the New Testament into Finnish; this was published in 1548.

=== Rector and ordinarius ===
In 1539 Agricola returned to Turku and ended up as the rector of Turku (Cathedral) School. He did not like his job, calling his students "untamed animals". At the time Gustav Vasa had confiscated the property of the church when he was consolidating his power but he also drove the Reformation. In 1544 Agricola received an order from the crown to send several talented young men to Stockholm's taxing offices. For some reason, Agricola did not obey until the order was sent again the next year, with a more menacing tone. This episode probably affected their relations negatively.

In 1546 Agricola lost his home and school in the Fire of Turku. On 22 February 1548, Gustav Vasa ordered Agricola to retire from his position as a rector. At this time Agricola was already married, but history knows his wife only by her name: Pirjo Olavintytär (Bridget, "daughter of Olavi"; Birgitta Olafsdotter, Brigida Olaui). His only son, Christian Agricola (Christianus Michaelis Agricola), was born 11 December 1550, and became the bishop of Tallinn in 1584.

When an old bishop died in 1554, Gustav Vasa had Agricola consecrated as the ordinarius of Turku parish - for all practical purposes Bishop of Turku and by extension the first Lutheran bishop for all Finland. Agricola was not a particularly strict or dedicated reformer, although he did remove the Canon of the Mass.

=== Death ===
In 1557, Agricola headed a delegation going to Russia on a diplomatic mission, and was in Moscow from 21 February to 24 March negotiating a peace treaty, the Treaty of Novgorod (1557). On 9 April he fell ill and died on Kyrönniemi peninsula near the Uusikirkko (now Polyane) village on the Karelian Isthmus. This day is also Elias Lönnrot's birthday and it is celebrated in Finland as the day of the Finnish language. Agricola was probably buried inside Viipuri's church, but the exact location of the grave is not known.

== Literary achievements ==
=== Abckiria ===
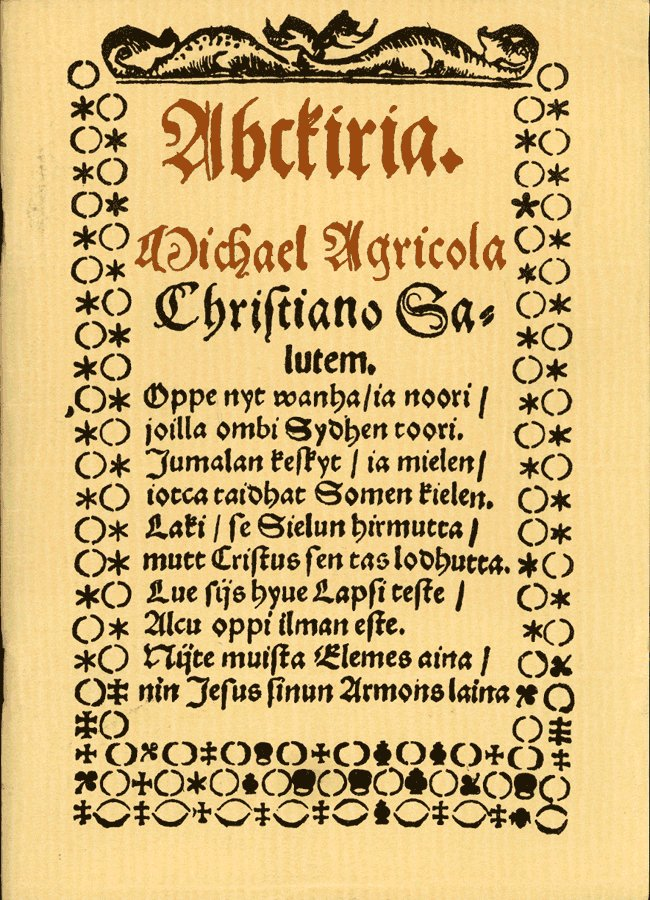
First page of Abckiria

Agricola had thought about translating the New Testament in his early years of study. At the time, however, there was no standard written form of Finnish, so he started developing it. His first book, Abckiria, which is nowadays known as the "ABC-kirja" or ABC book, was a primer for reading and a catechism. It was first printed in 1543. The catechism was included because only very few people could afford the whole Bible at the time. The first printing contained 16 pages.

A second printing was released in 1551 with 24 pages.

In 1966 Åke Åbergin, a librarian, discovered parts, while repairing book bindings, from an as yet unknown (likely the third) edition of the "ABC-kirja" that included the name of the printer, Amund Lauritsanpoika, and fortuitously the publishing date of 1559 (two years after the author's death) of the final as yet undiscovered 8 pages. The pages were likely the result of an imposing error and relegated to padding paper.

=== Rucouskiria ===
Agricola's Rucouskiria Bibliasta (contemporary Finnish spelling: Rukouskirja; literally, "Prayer Book from the Bible") was printed in March 1544. At the beginning of the book, Agricola wrote about many topics concerning all-round education and the Reformation's effects in Finland. The book includes four prefaces and about 700 prayers on many topics; it even has twelve structurally different kinds of prayers, instead of the usual two or three. It is the most independent work by Agricola and contains approximately 900 pages. His sources include the works of Luther, Melanchthon, and Erasmus.

=== New Testament translation ===
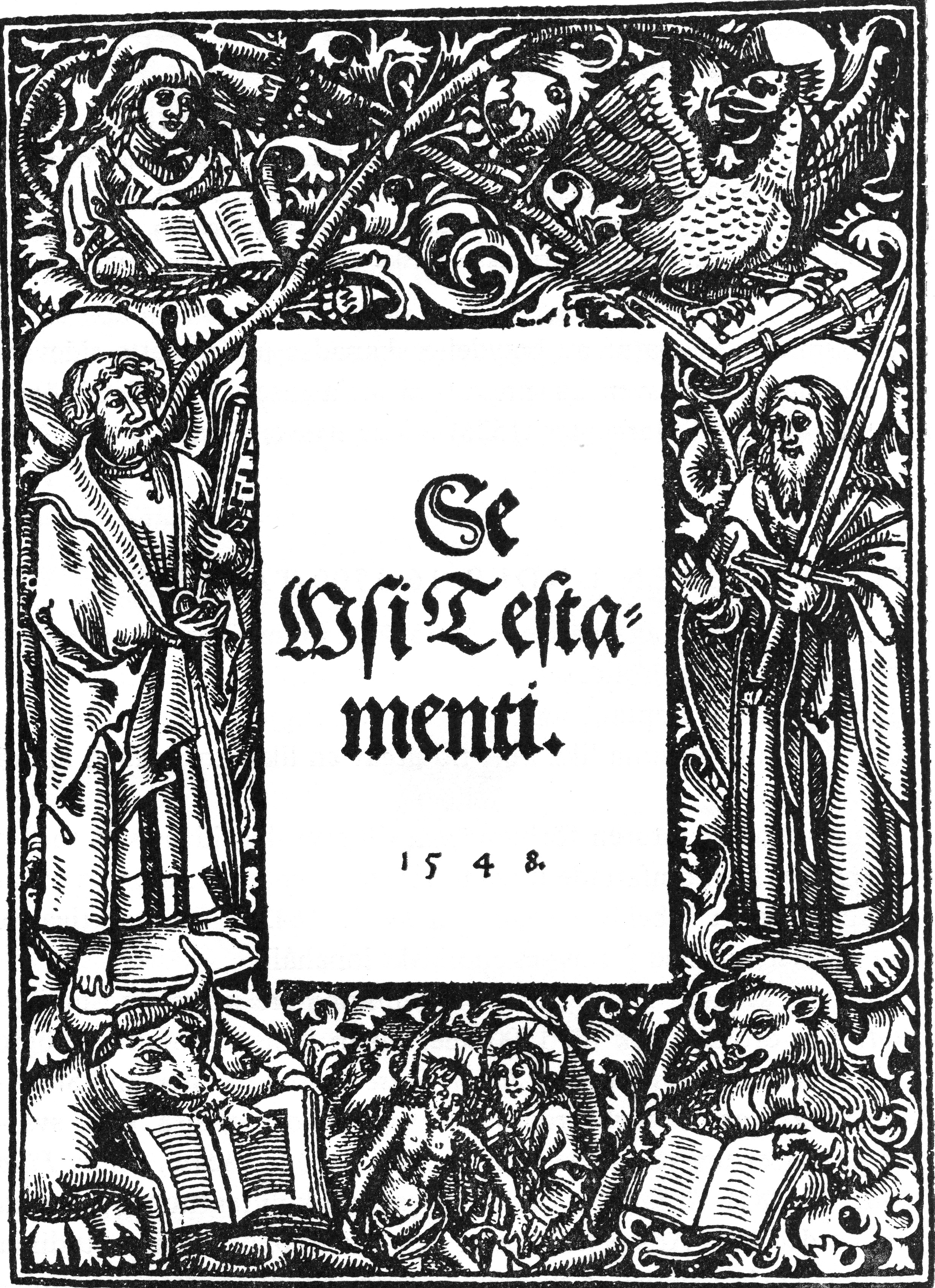
Cover of Se Wsi Testamenti, or the New Testament

Agricola's most prominent book is the first Finnish-language translation of the New Testament. The manuscript was completed in 1548. It contains 718 pages and many illustrations.

=== Liturgical books ===
While Agricola was in Wittenberg, he translated three smaller liturgical books into Finnish. These books were printed in 1549.

Käsikirja Castesta ia muista Christikunnan Menoista includes forms for christening, marriage and burial, as well as speeches for the sick, mourning and dying. It is translated from Olaus Petri's corresponding work except for the christening and marriage portions, which are from Luther. It also contains minor elements translated from works of Caspar Huberinus.

Messu eli Herran echtolinen includes the form for a service. It is also based on Olaus Petri's work and a few Finnish manuscripts. In this book Agricola revealed his next mission: the translation of the Old Testament.

Se meiden Herran Jesusen Christusen Pina, ylesnousemus ia tauiaisen Astumus, niste Neliest Euangelisterist coghottuon tells about Jesus Christ's suffering. It is collected from all four gospels. This book was influenced heavily by Johannes Bugenhagen, a teacher in Wittenberg. It was mainly translated from the German version, but some parts are influenced by the Swedish version and Agricola's own translation of the New Testament.

== Commemorations ==
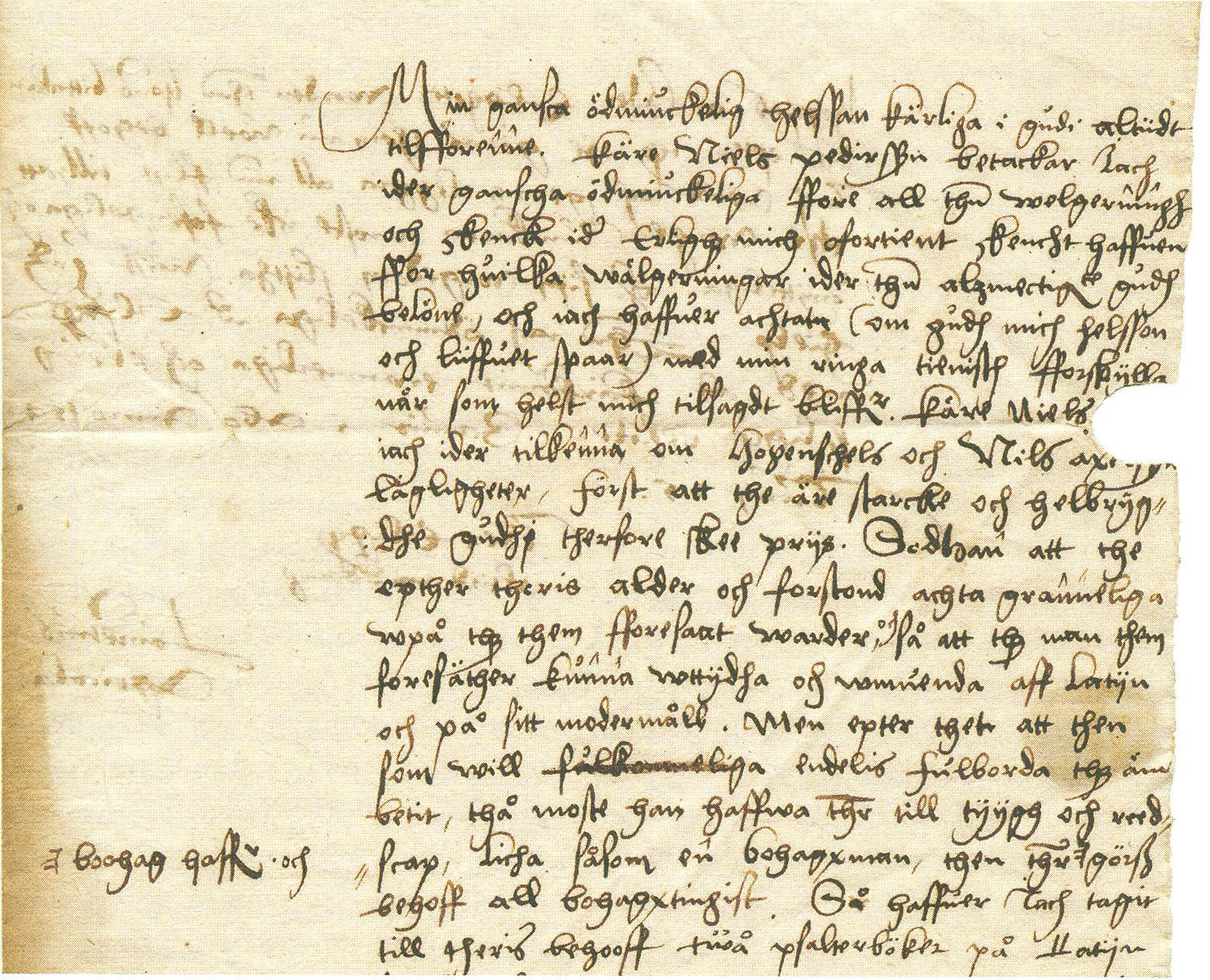
A letter written in Swedish by Mikael Agricola to Nils Bielke

The Evangelical Lutheran Church in America remembers Bishop Agricola annually on 10 April.

The Evangelical Lutheran Church of Finland commemorates him on 9 April.

A bronze statue of Agricola stands at the Lutheran Peter and Paul Church in Vyborg.

Mikael Agricola Church in Helsinki is named after Agricola. As well the Agricola Lutheran Church memorializes his namesake in Toronto Canada. An asteroid 3212 Agricola is named after Agricola.

In 2007, 450 years after his death, Agricola was selected as the main motif for a commemorative coin, the €10 Mikael Agricola and Finnish language commemorative coin. This collector coin was issued to honor Agricola's life work as a contributor to the Protestant reformation in Finland and as the father of the Finnish written language. The reverse side depicts a quill to reference the writer, while the coin's obverse side contains an artistic interpretation of a human figure.

== Gallery ==
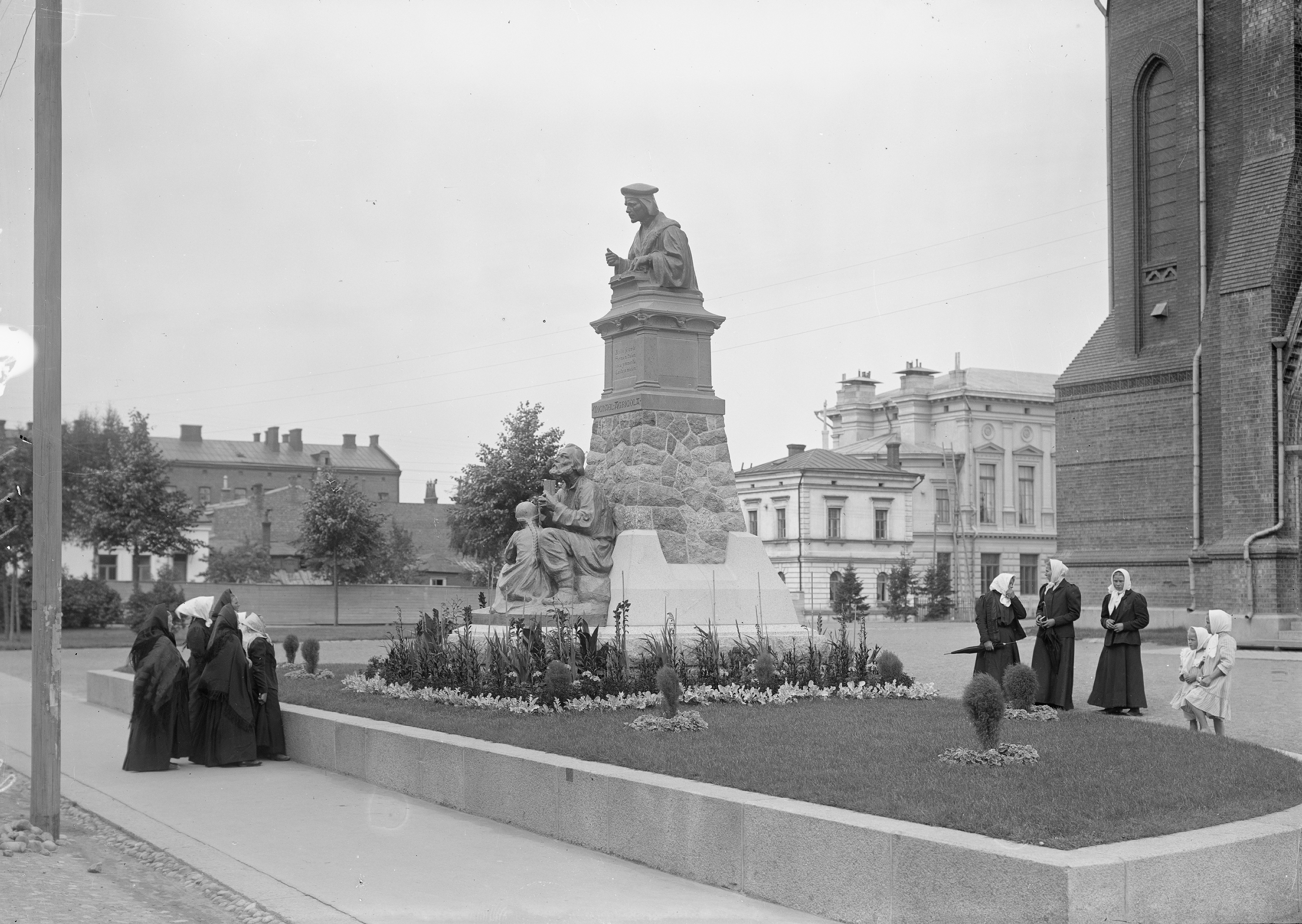
The original statue of Mikael Agricola in Vyborg by Emil Wikström, photographed on the day of its reveal in 21 June 1908
(Note: The statue was lost in the Winter War.)

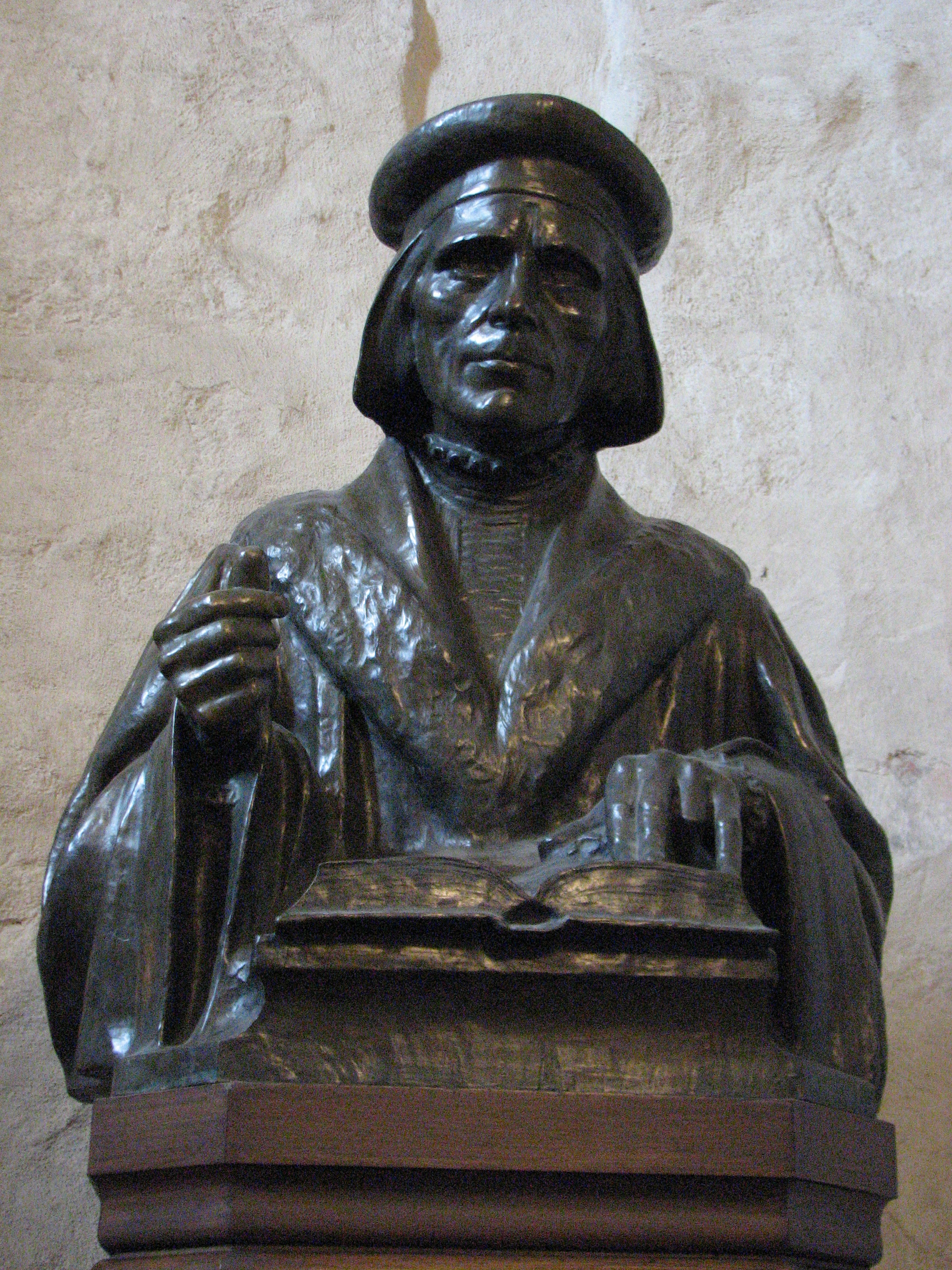
1910 recast in the Turku Cathedral

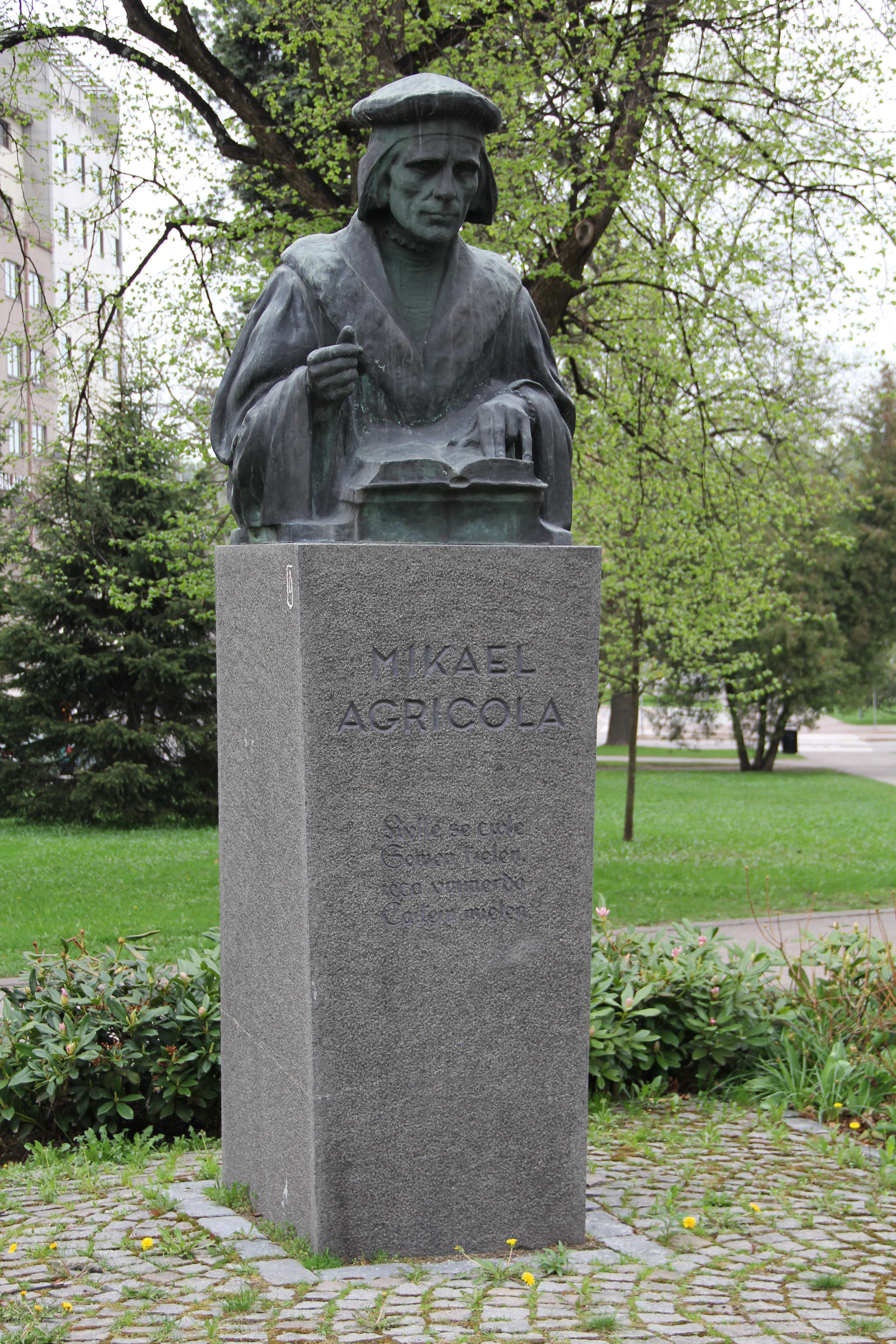
1953 recast in Lahti

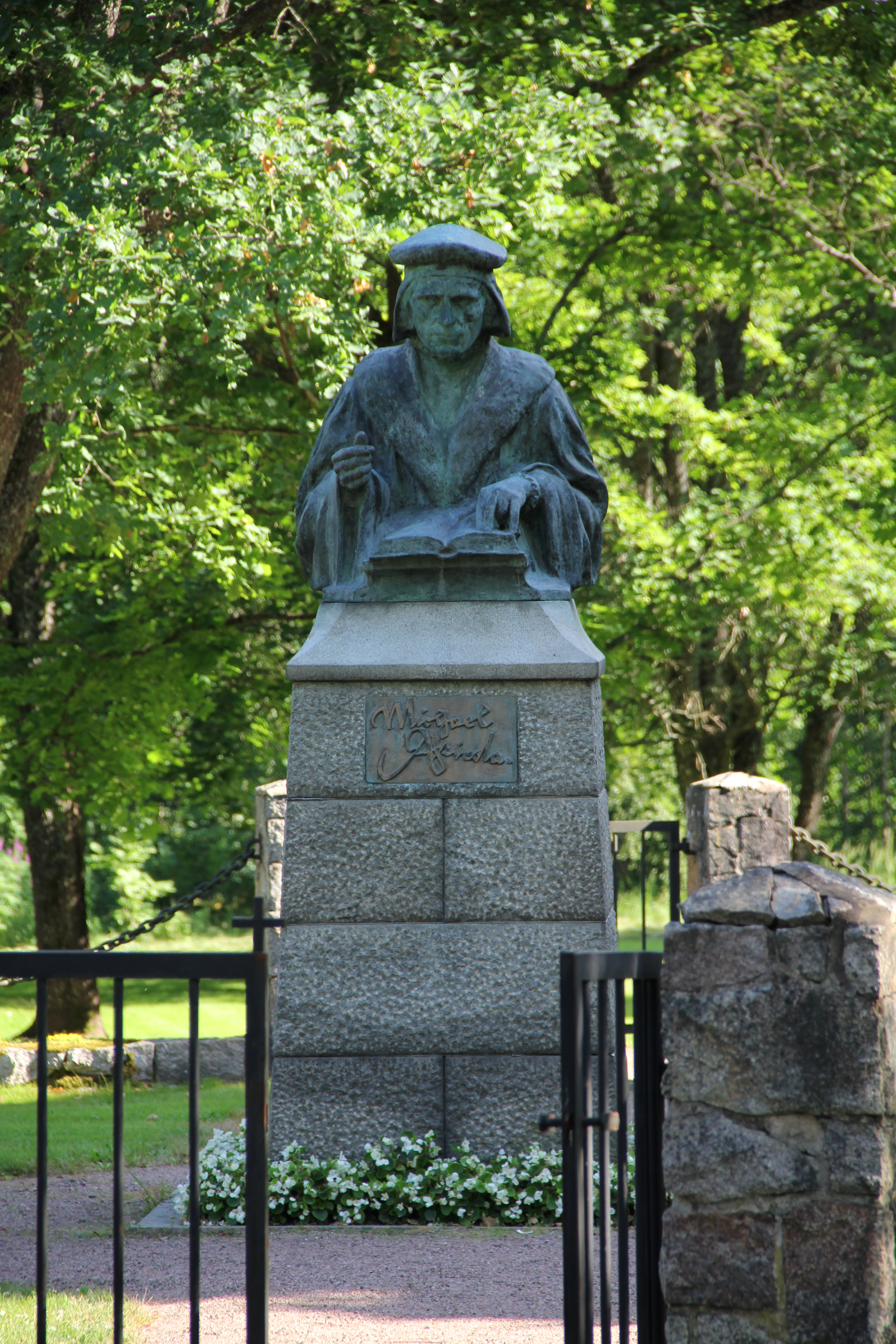
1959 recast in Pernå (today part of Loviisa)

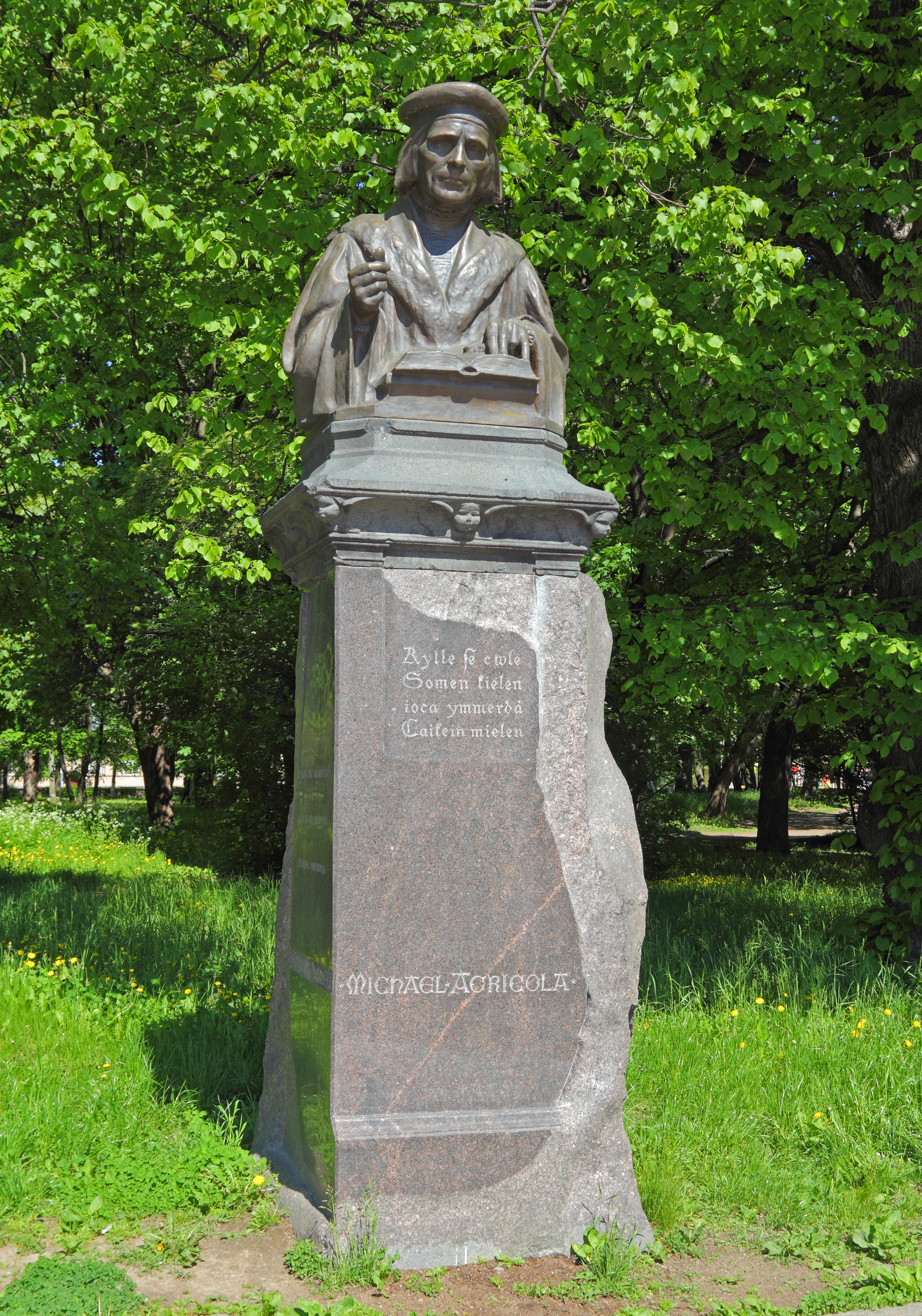
New 1993 recast in Vyborg
(Note: The statue was 1993–2009 inside Vyborg Library)

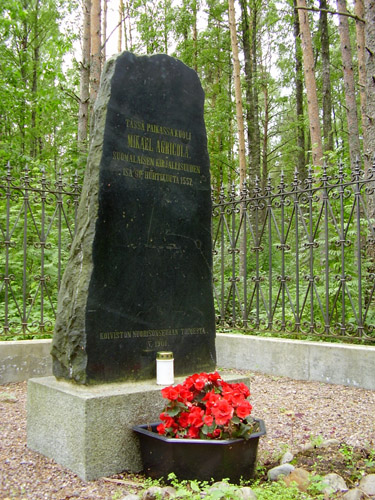
Monument near the place of Agricola's death, close to Primorsk

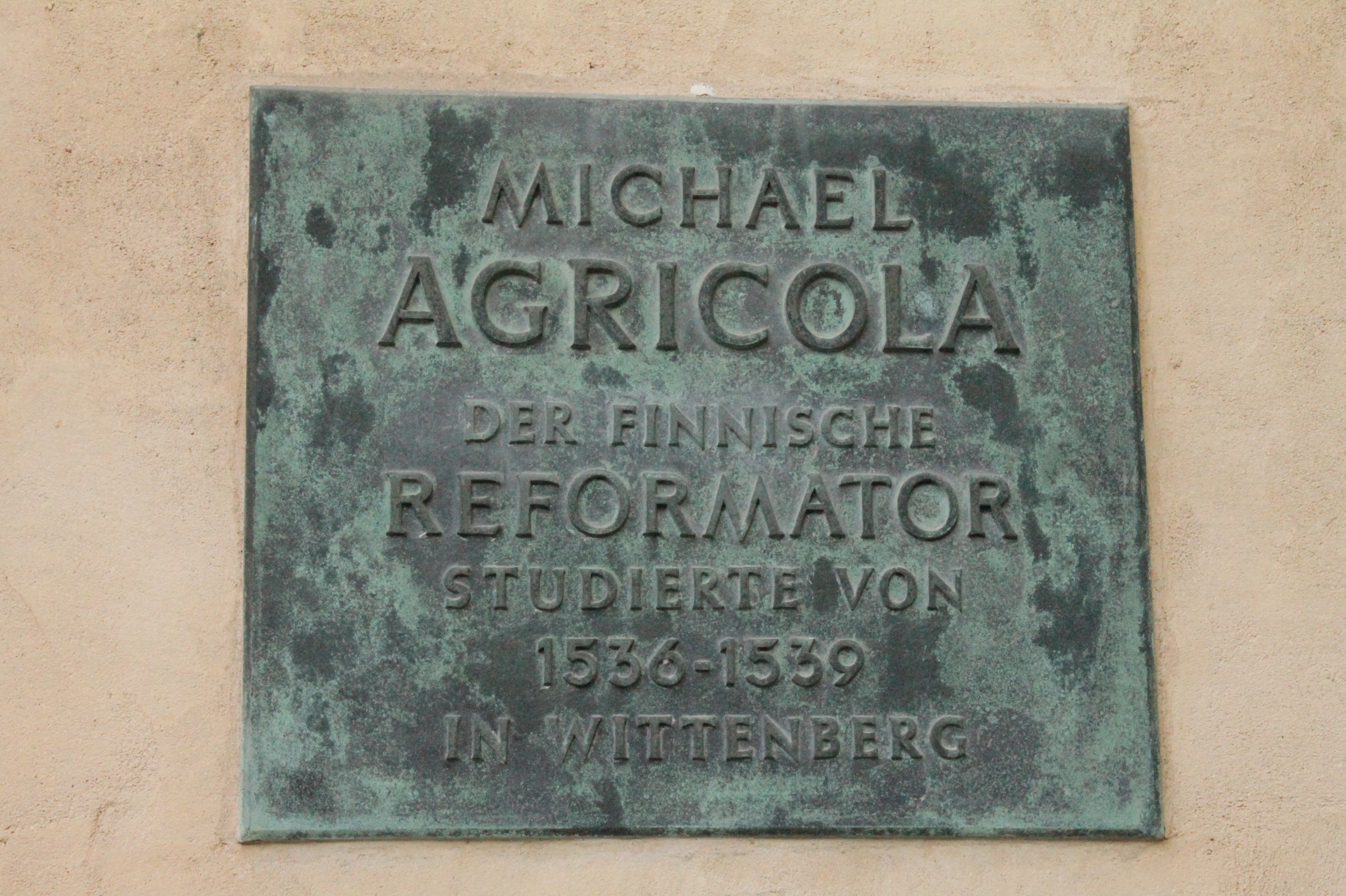
Plaque to Agricola in Wittenberg

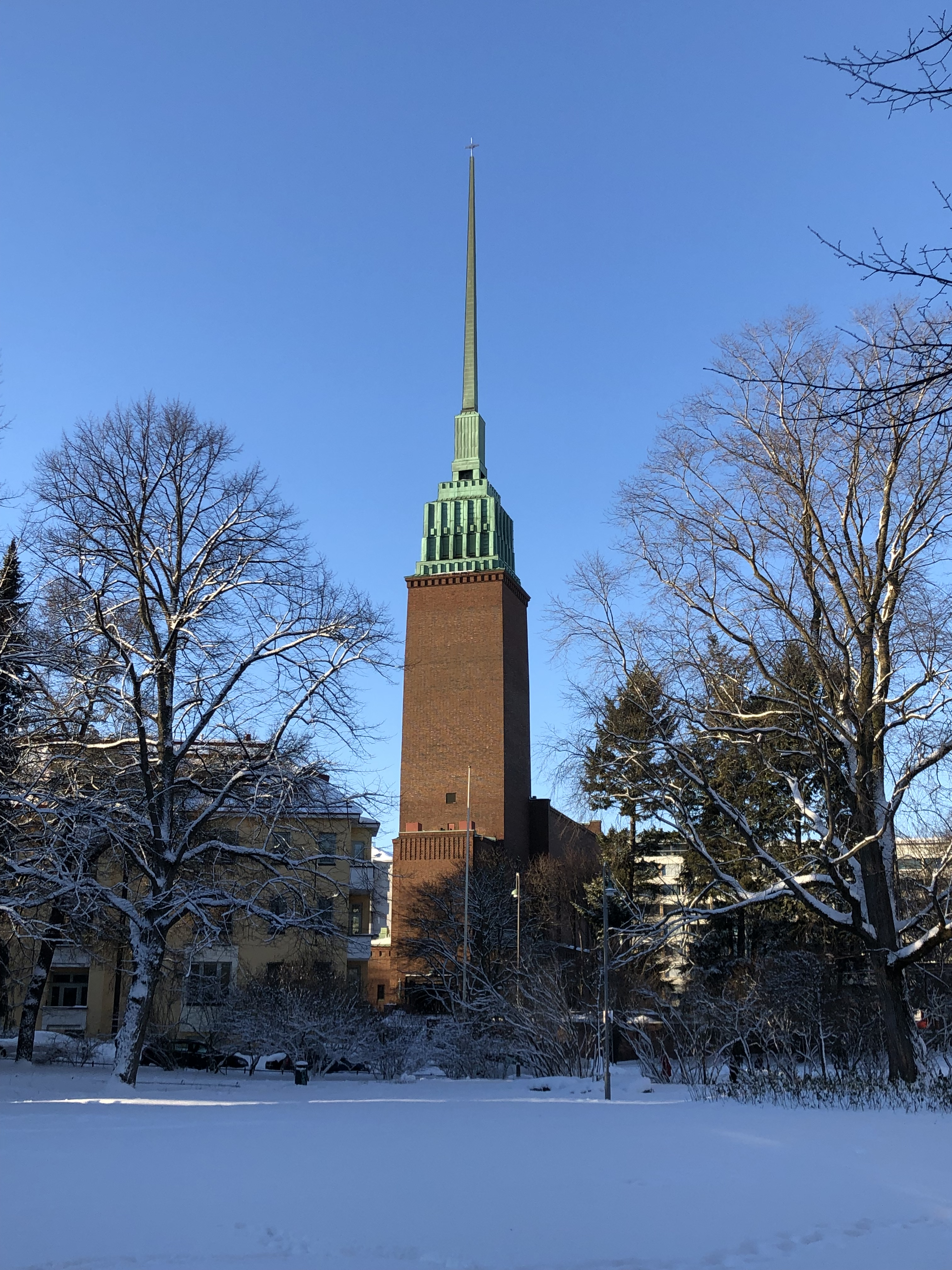
Mikael Agricola Church in Helsinki named after him

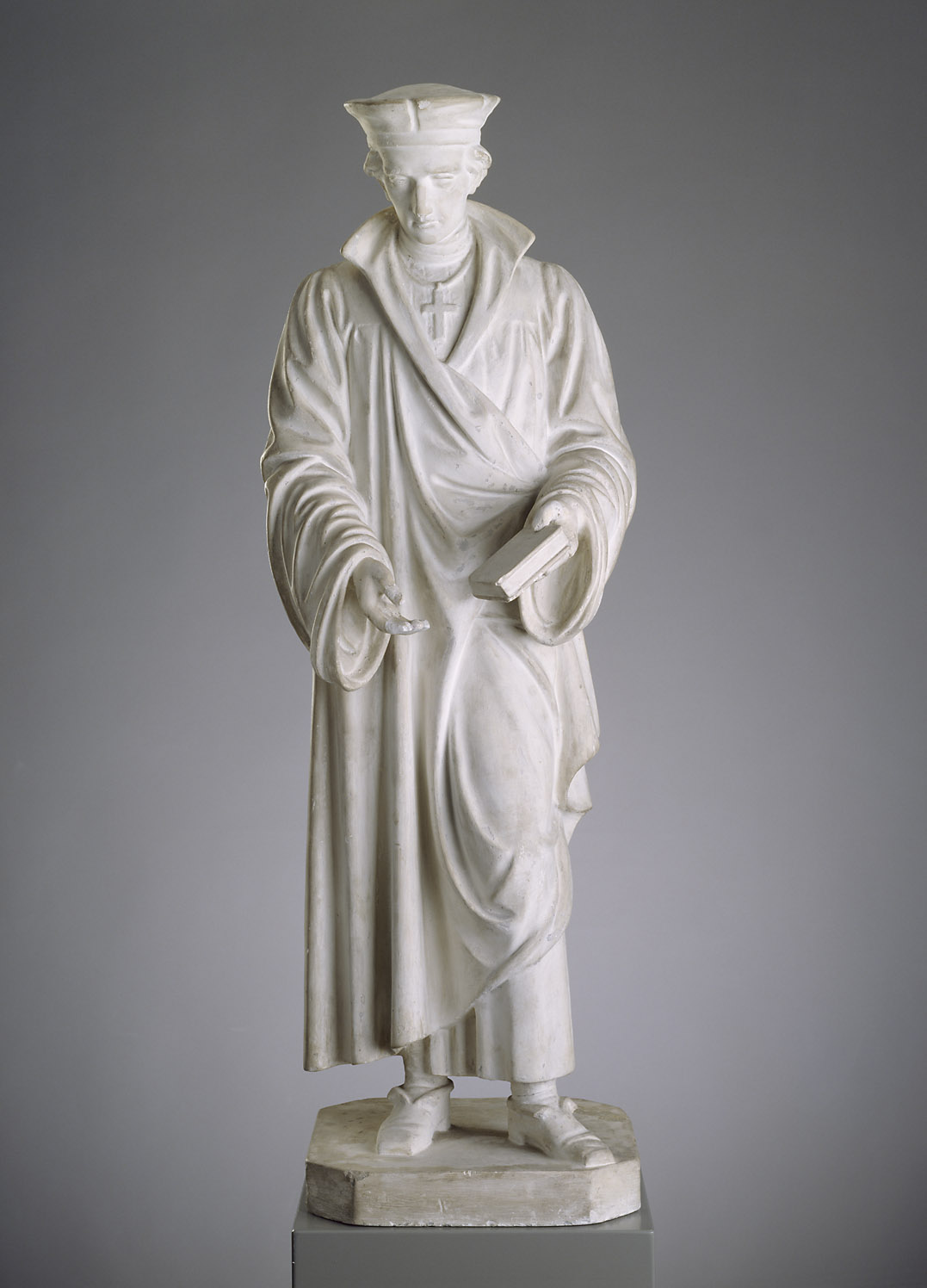
Statue of Agricola by Carl Eneas Sjöstrand, 1877

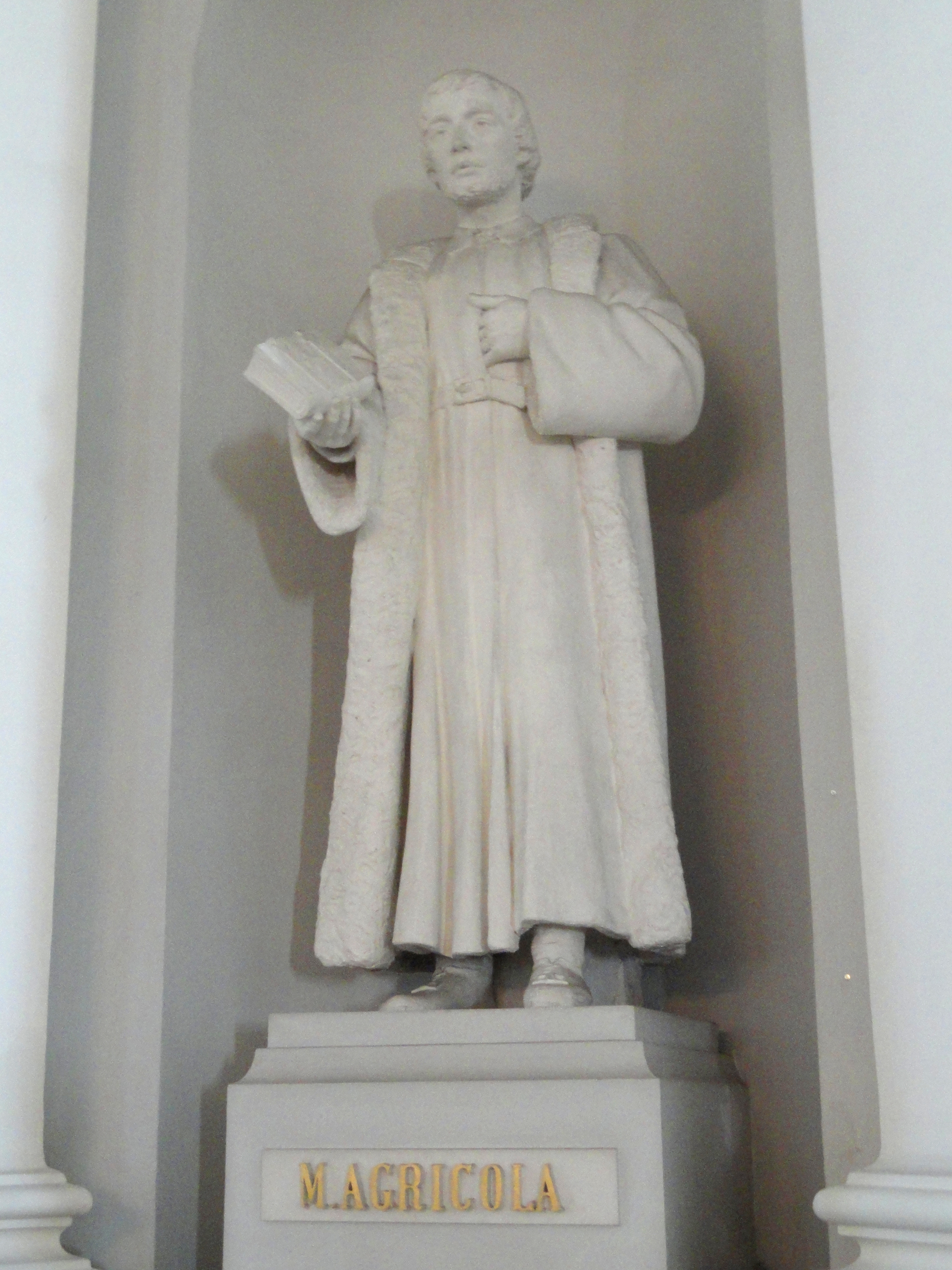
Statue of Agricola by Ville Vallgren in the Helsinki Cathedral, 1887

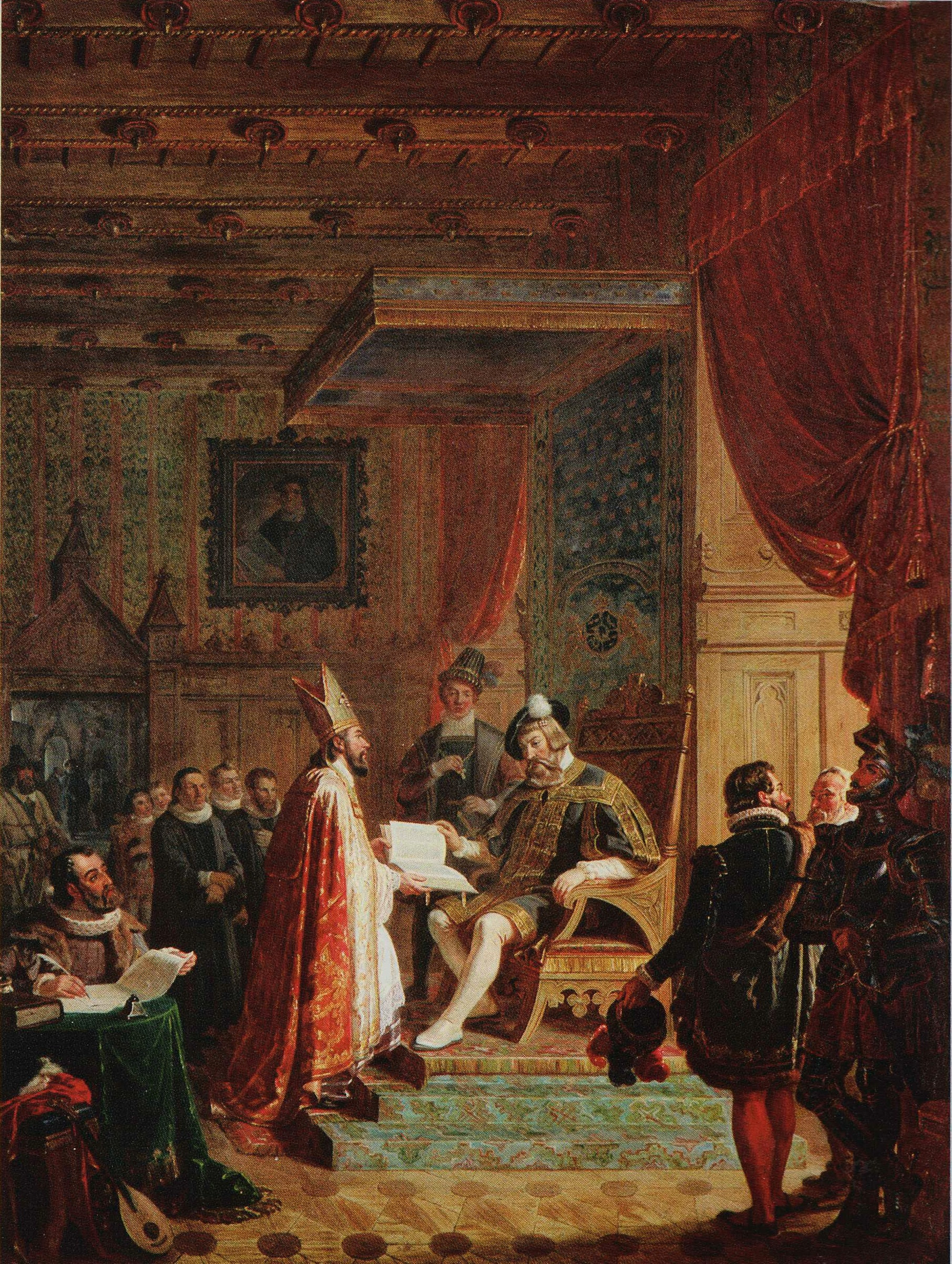
Mikael Agricola Hands Over the Finnish Translation of the New Testament to King Gustav Wasa, Robert Wilhelm Ekman, 1853

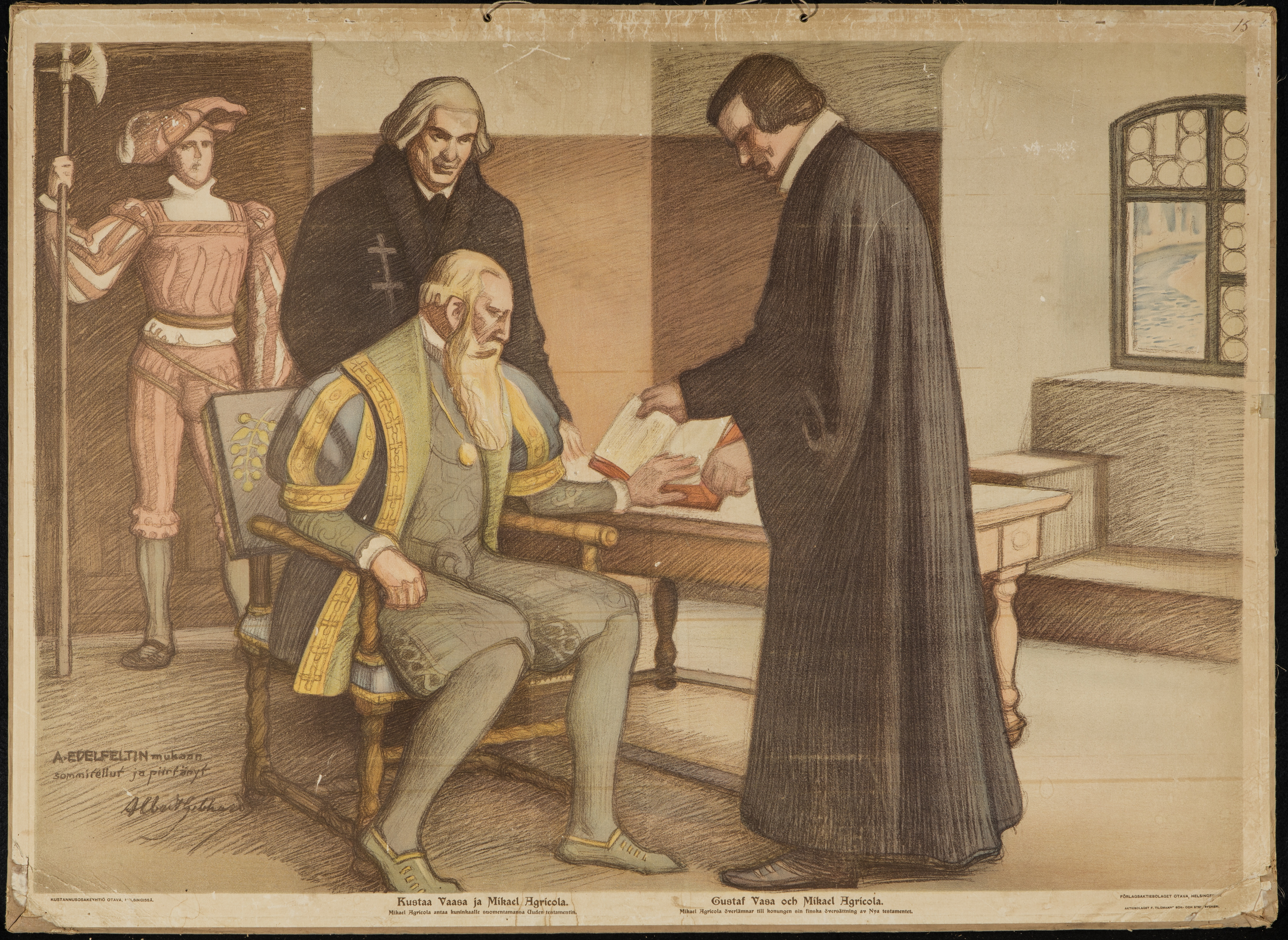
Educational poster of Agricola handing Se Wsi Testamenti, the Finnish translation of the New Testament, to Gustav Vasa by Albert Gebhard

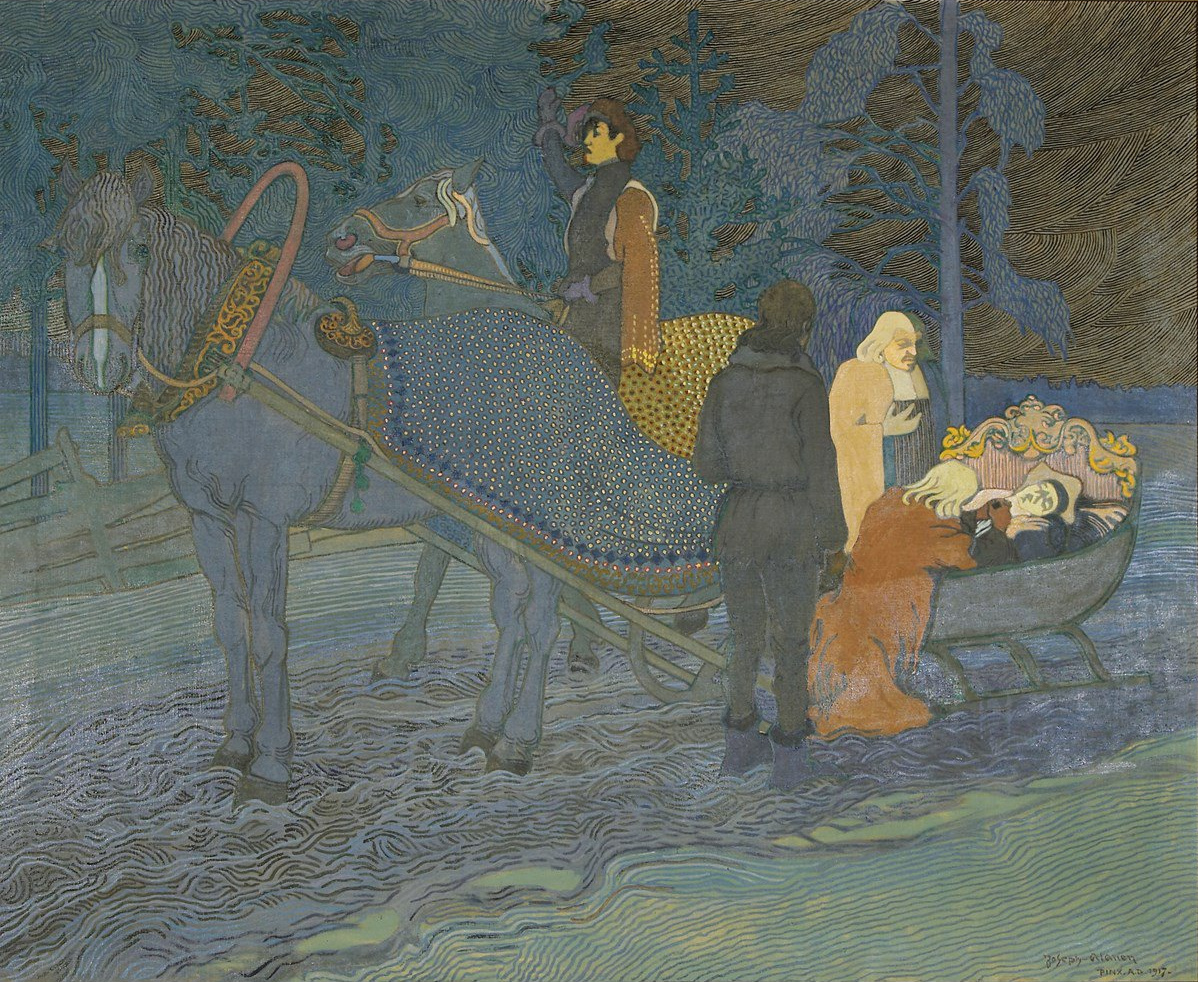
The Death of Agricola by Joseph Alanen, 1917

== See also ==
- Mikael Agricola Day – Flag-flying day in Finland

== Notes ==
Religious titles
Preceded by New office	Lutheran bishop of Turku; 1554 – 1557	Succeeded by Petrus Follingius
