= Agricola of Nevers =

Bishop of Nevers, France (died 594)

Saint Agricola of Nevers (French: Agricole de Nevers; d. 594) was Bishop of Nevers from 580 to 26 February 594.

Agricola was present at the Council of Lyon in 581, the Second Council of Mâcon in 581, and the Third Council of Mâcon in 585.

He is venerated as a saint in the Roman Catholic Church; his feast day is 26 February.
