= Agricola Park =

Urban park in Warsaw, Poland

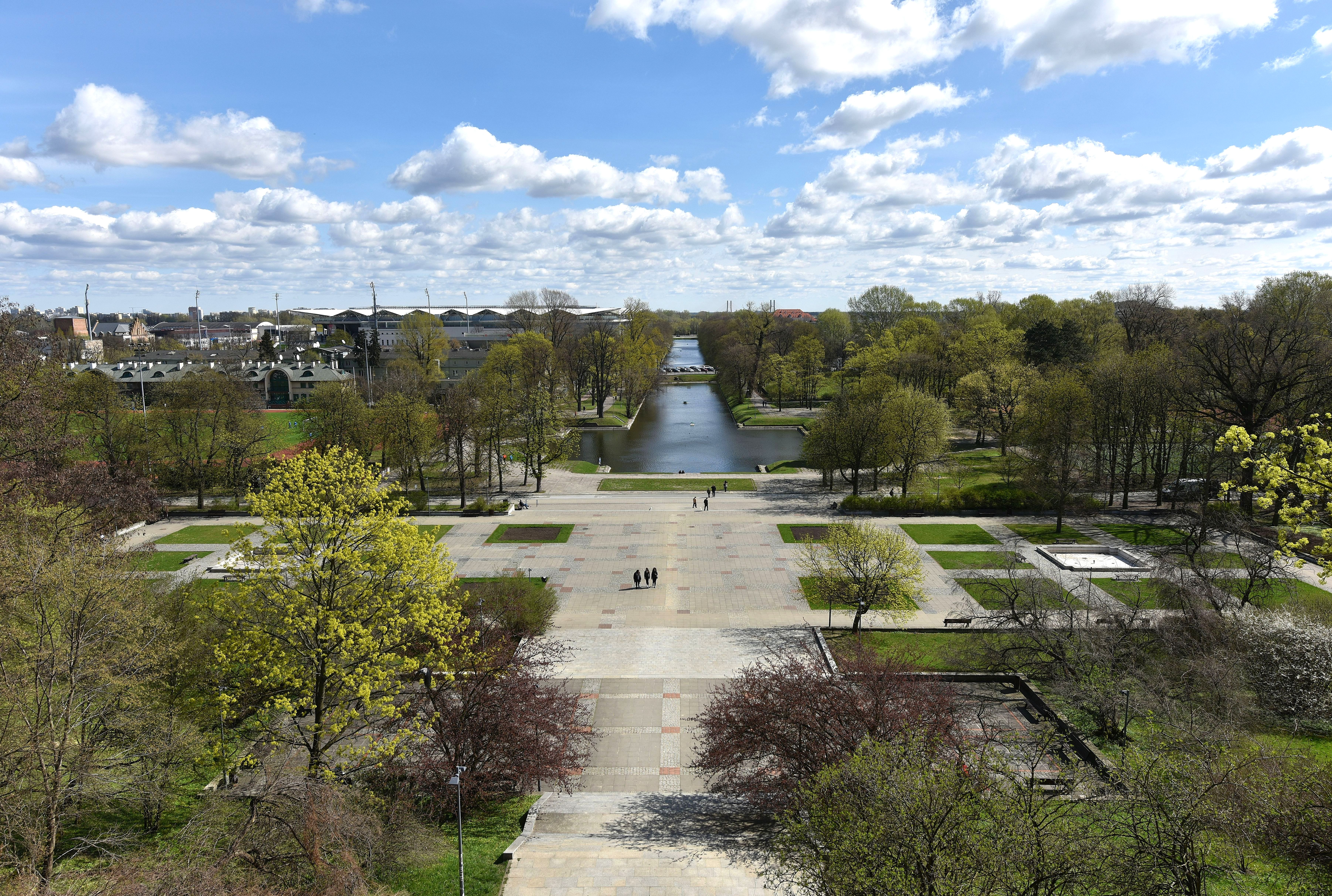
- A public square at the centre of the Agricola Park, as seen from the Ujazdów Castle.
- Interactive map of Agricola Park
- Type: Urban park
- Location: Downtown, Warsaw, Poland
- Coordinates: 52°13′7.61″N 21°02′8.7″E
- Area: 4.72 hectares (11.7 acres)
- Created: 1723

Agricola Park (Italian pronunciation: [aˈɡri.ko.la]; Polish: Park Agrykola), also known as Agrykola Park (Polish pronunciation: [a.ɡrɘ̟ˈkɔ.la]), and the North Baths (Polish: Łazienki Północne), is an urban park in Warsaw, Poland. It is located in the neighbourhood of Ujazdów, within the Downtown district, to the north of the Royal Baths Park. It was developed between 1720 and 1723, forming a part of the Royal Baths Park, and was separated from it in the 19th century.

== Toponymy ==
The Agricola Park (Polish: Park Agrykola) is named after the nearby Agrykola Street, which in turn was named after Karol Ludwik Agricola, an engineer who designed it in the 18th century. The park is also alternatively known as the North Baths (Polish: Łazienki Północne) in reference to the Royal Baths Park located to its south.

== History ==
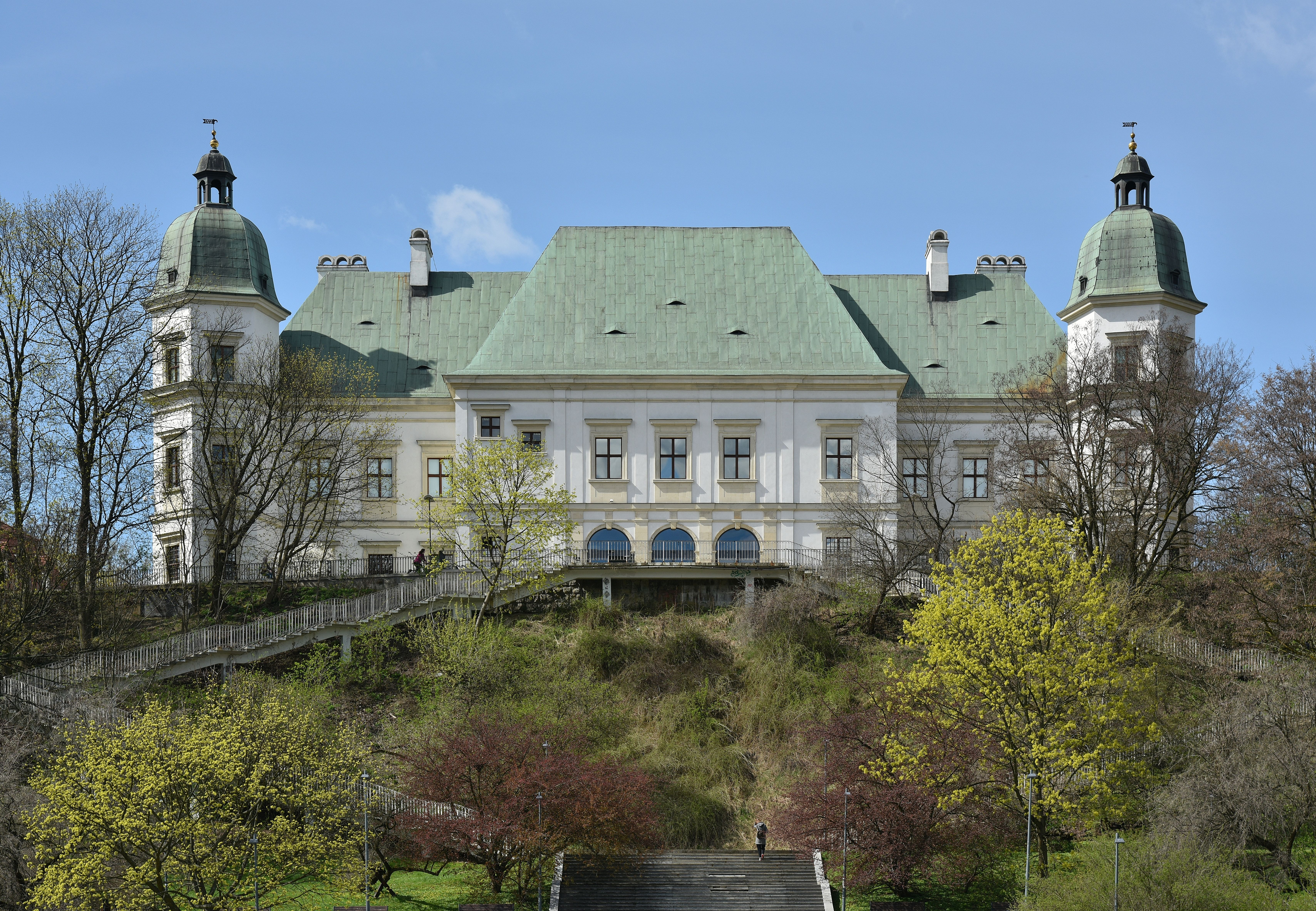
The Ujazdów Castle, built in 1624, as seen from the Agricola Park.

The park was developed between 1720 and 1723, as part of the Royal Baths park complex, to the east of the Ujazdów Castle, the residence of the King of Poland and the Grand Duke of Lithuania, which itself dates to 1624. The Piaseczno Canal, an artificial waterway developed to feed the ponds in the Royal Baths park complex, was developed between 1717 and 1726, with its western end located to the east from the Agricola Park. Between 1778 and 1779, Agrykola Street was developed to the south from the Agricola Park, later becoming its namesake, being itself named after its designer, Karol Ludwik Agricola.

The Agricola Park was separated administratively from the Royal Baths Park in the 19th century. In 1899, one of the first playgrounds in the city was opened in the park. It was built by the Warsaw Hygienic Society, and founded by businessperson Wilhelm Rau.

In 1925, the Agrykola ski jumping hill was constructed at Warsaw Escarpment in the park. It had the construction point of 20 m (65.6 ft.). Its furthest recorded jump measured 25 m (82 ft), being performed by Władysław Gąsienica-Roj in 1957. The hill was deconstructed in the 1970s.

In 1965, the park was granted the status of a protected cultural property, being added to the voivodeship heritage list.

On 9 June 1991, during his visit to Warsaw, Pope John Paul II organised a mass in the park. On 9 June 2014, a monument, in the form of a plaque, was unveiled at the location in the commemoration of the event.

== Characteristics ==
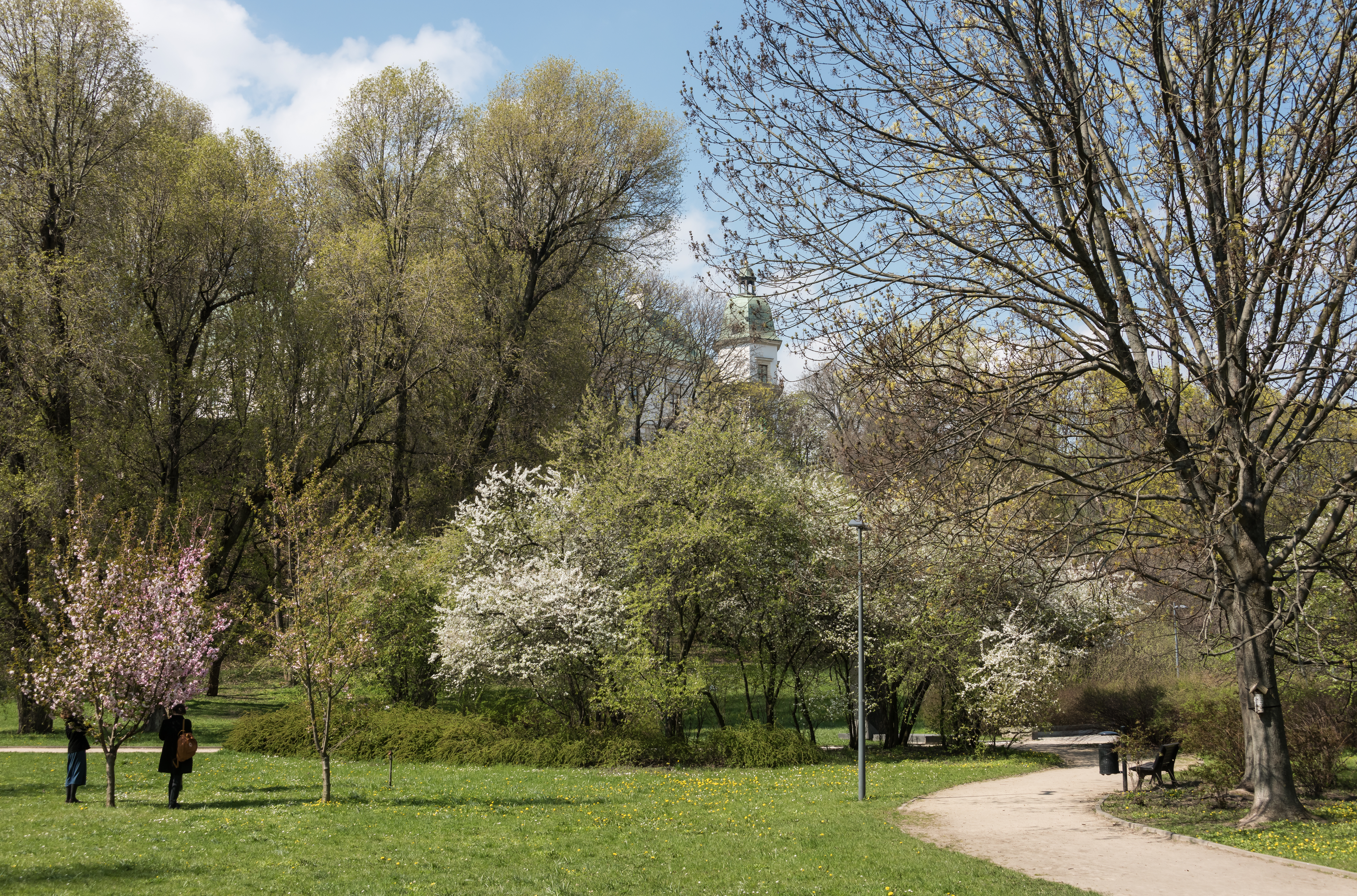
A pathway in the Agricola Park.

The Agricola Park is placed between Baths Route, Hopfera Avenue, Agrykola Street, and the peaks of the Warsaw Escarpment. It has an area of 4.72 ha (11.7 acres). In its centre, it features a public square located between Hopfera Avenue and the escarpment. The Ujazdów Castle, a Baroque and Neoclassical residence from 1624, stands to the west of the park, housing the Ujazdów Castle Centre for Contemporary Art. To the east, the park borders the western end of the Piaseczno Canal, an artificial water canal created in between 1717 and 1726. To the south, Agricola Park borders the Royal Baths Park, being separated from it by Agrykola Street.

The Agricola Warsaw Youth Sports Centre is also placed to the northeast from the park.

== Gallery ==
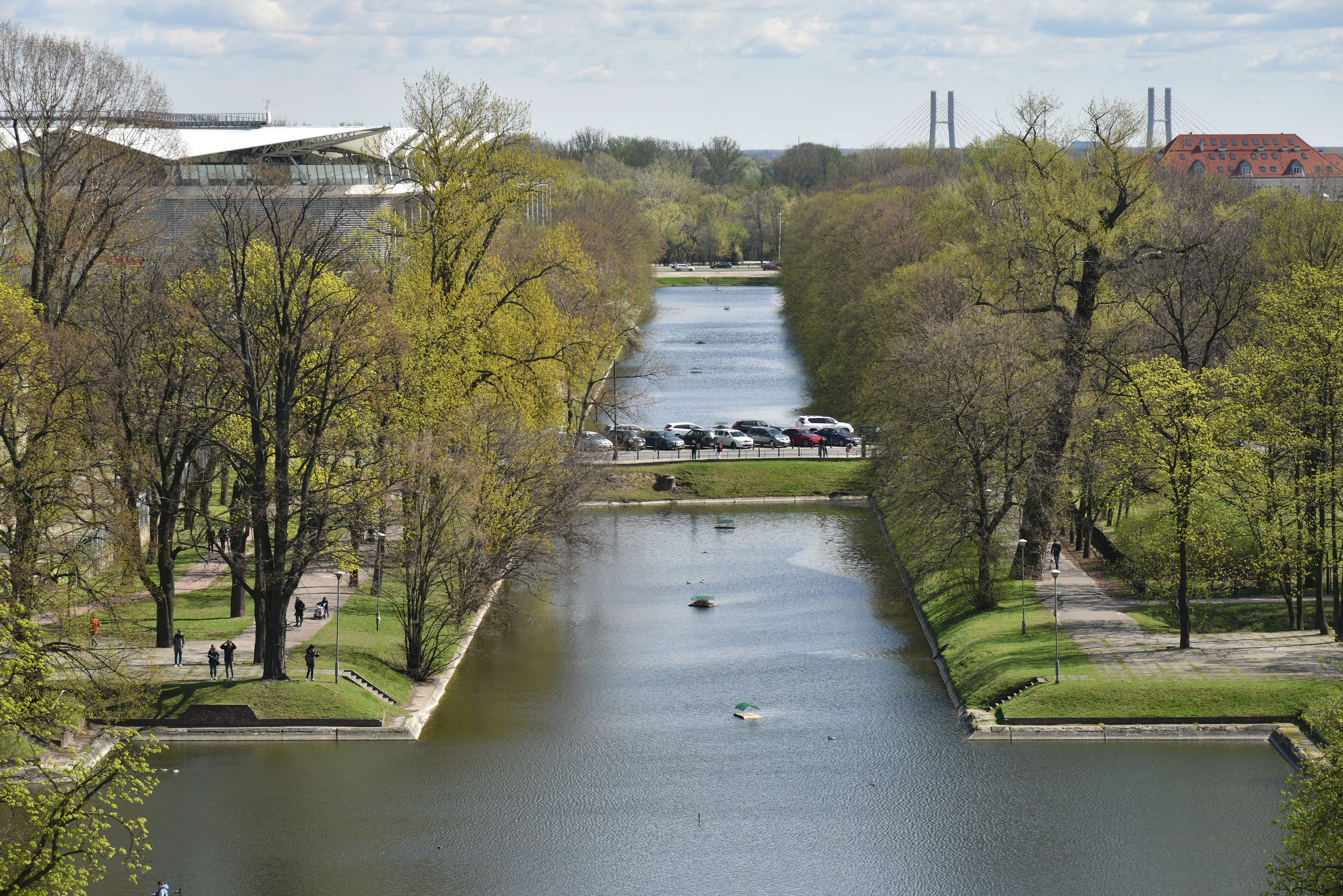
The western ending of the Piaseczno Canal, an artificial waterway, placed next to the park.
