= Statue of Friedrich Wilhelm von Steuben =

Statue by Albert Jaegers in Washington, D.C., U.S.

- Major General Friedrich Wilhelm von Steuben
- U.S. National Register of Historic Places
- U.S. National Historic Landmark District – Contributing property
- D.C. Inventory of Historic Sites
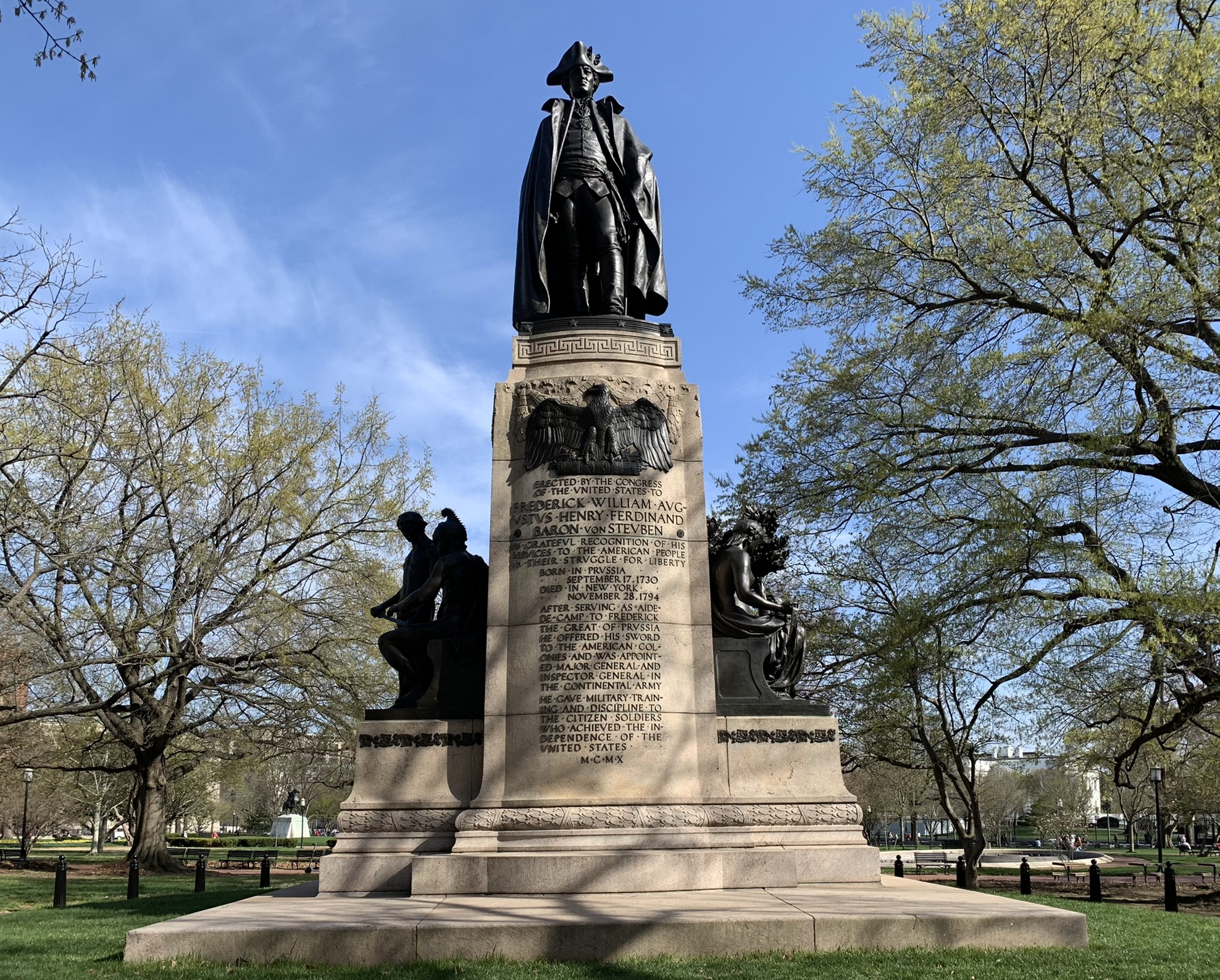
- Von Steuben statue in 2022
- Location: Lafayette Square, Washington, D.C.
- Coordinates: 38°54′0″N 77°2′15.72″W
- Built: 1910
- Architects: Albert Jaegers (sculptor); Cass Gilbert (architect); T. R. Johnson (architect)
- Part of: American Revolution Statuary; Lafayette Square Historic District; L'Enfant Plan
- NRHP reference No.: 78000256 (American Revolution Statuary); 70000833 Lafayette Square Historic District; 97000332 (L'Enfant Plan)

Significant dates
- Added to NRHP: August 29, 1970 (Lafayette Square Historic District); July 14, 1978 (American Revolution Statuary); April 24, 1997 (L'Enfant Plan)
- Designated DCIHS: January 19, 1971 (L'Enfant Plan); June 19, 1973 (Lafayette Square Historic District); March 3, 1979 (American Revolution Statuary)

Major General Friedrich Wilhelm von Steuben is a bronze statue of Friedrich Wilhelm von Steuben, a Prussian soldier who assisted the Thirteen Colonies during the American Revolutionary War. Steuben had fought in previous wars, earning promotions until he assisted in the courts of Frederick the Great and later Josef Friedrich Wilhelm, Prince of Hohenzollern-Hechingen. After meeting with Benjamin Franklin, and fearing for his safety in Europe after alleged homosexual behavior, Steuben and his associates arrived to help the Continental Army.

He met General George Washington at Valley Forge, where he helped turn the army there into one that was capable to fight. Steuben assisted with the Southern Campaign and Siege of Yorktown, after which the American forces were successful in winning the war. Steuben was given land and later retired in New York, where he died in 1794.

In the late 1890s, plans were made to erect statues in Lafayette Square, Washington, D.C., honoring foreign heroes. An Act of Congress passed in 1903 led to the eventual erection of the statue honoring Steuben in 1910. It was sculpted by Albert Jaegers with assistance in the design of the base by Cass Gilbert and T. R. Johnson. The unveiling ceremony was attended by around 10,000 people, including President William Howard Taft. A large parade took place after the ceremony. A replica of the statue was given to Germany and erected in Potsdam the following year.

The statue rests on a tall base adorned with two sets of figures. Steuben's statue is one of 14 American Revolution Statuary in Washington, D.C., that were collectively listed on the National Register of Historic Places in 1978 and the District of Columbia Inventory of Historic Sites the following year. In addition, the statue is a contributing property to the L'Enfant Plan and the Lafayette Square Historic District, a National Historic Landmark.

== History ==
=== Biography ===
Friedrich Wilhelm von Steuben was born in 1730 in Magdeburg, Prussia, which is in modern-day Germany. He was educated by Jesuits, but was a critic of Roman Catholicism. He would later convert to the Reformed German Church. As a youth, he and his father allegedly fought in a battle during the War of the Austrian Succession. At the age of 17, Steuben joined the Prussian Army and later fought in the Seven Years' War. After fighting in a number of battles, some of which saw him sustain injuries, he rose through the ranks until becoming aide-de-camp to Frederick the Great. After the war concluded, Steuben was unemployed for a year.

The following year, Steuben became Hofmarschall to Josef Friedrich Wilhelm, Prince of Hohenzollern-Hechingen, until 1777. Starting in 1771, he used the title Baron. Steuben had been introduced to Claude Louis, Comte de Saint-Germain, in the 1760s, and met again in 1777. Steuben was introduced to Benjamin Franklin that year, but Franklin was unable to offer him money or military rank in the Continental Army fighting the Kingdom of Great Britain in the Thirteen Colonies. Although Steuben was initially uninterested in fighting in the war, due to having to start as a volunteer without rank, he left for America after an issue occurred in Prussia. It is thought Steuben had committed homosexual acts and was fearful of being imprisoned.

Steuben and members of his party, including Peter Stephen Du Ponceau and aide-de-camp Louis de Pontière, arrived in New Hampshire in late 1777. After meeting with the Continental Congress, where he was mistakenly presented as a lieutenant general, it was agreed Steuben would be paid following the war, based on his actions. He arrived at Valley Forge in early 1778. It was here he met General George Washington and was promoted to Inspector General. Steuben took to task making the unorganized army into a group of readied soldiers, creating drills and directly working with the troops. The army's improvement was noted by other officers and members of the Continental Congress. Steuben was then promoted to major general. In 1779, his book, Regulations for the Order and Discipline of the Troops of the United States, was approved by Congress.

Steuben began serving active duty again in spring 1779, fighting alongside General Nathanael Greene in the Southern Campaign, and leading one of the three divisions at the Siege of Yorktown. After the American colonies won the war, he resigned his position. Steuben adopted three young soldiers, including future Senator William North, in the years following the war. Despite not receiving all of the compensation he requested, Steuben was given free land in Virginia, Pennsylvania, and New York, which he partially sold. A few years later, Steuben left New York City due to a forced retirement, and spent his last years on his land in New York. He died in 1794, leaving his land to North and Benjamin Walker.

=== Memorial ===
Beginning in the late 1890s, government officials in Washington, D.C., planned to erect statues in Lafayette Square, across the street from the White House, honoring foreign heroes of the American Revolutionary War. The third out of four of these memorials would be one to honor Steuben. An Act of Congress passed in 1903 to erect a memorial to Steuben, with the law being signed by President Theodore Roosevelt on February 27, 1903. The cost appropriated for the statue and its erection was $50,000, and a memorial commission was created to oversee the installation and unveiling.

It would be two years until a competition was created to find a sculptor. Six artists submitted designs, with three chosen as possibilities, later reduced to two models. In May 1906, the remaining models were shown to the commission and German American Albert Jaegers, who designed many sculptures for the federal government, was chosen the winner. Sculptor Augustus Saint-Gaudens also approved the design. The commission did not sign a contract until January 1907 and Jaeger completed the working model the following year. The two groups of statues on the base were completed December 1908 and the Steuben statue the following July. Architects Cass Gilbert and T. R. Johnson assisted Jaegers with designing the base.

=== Dedication ===
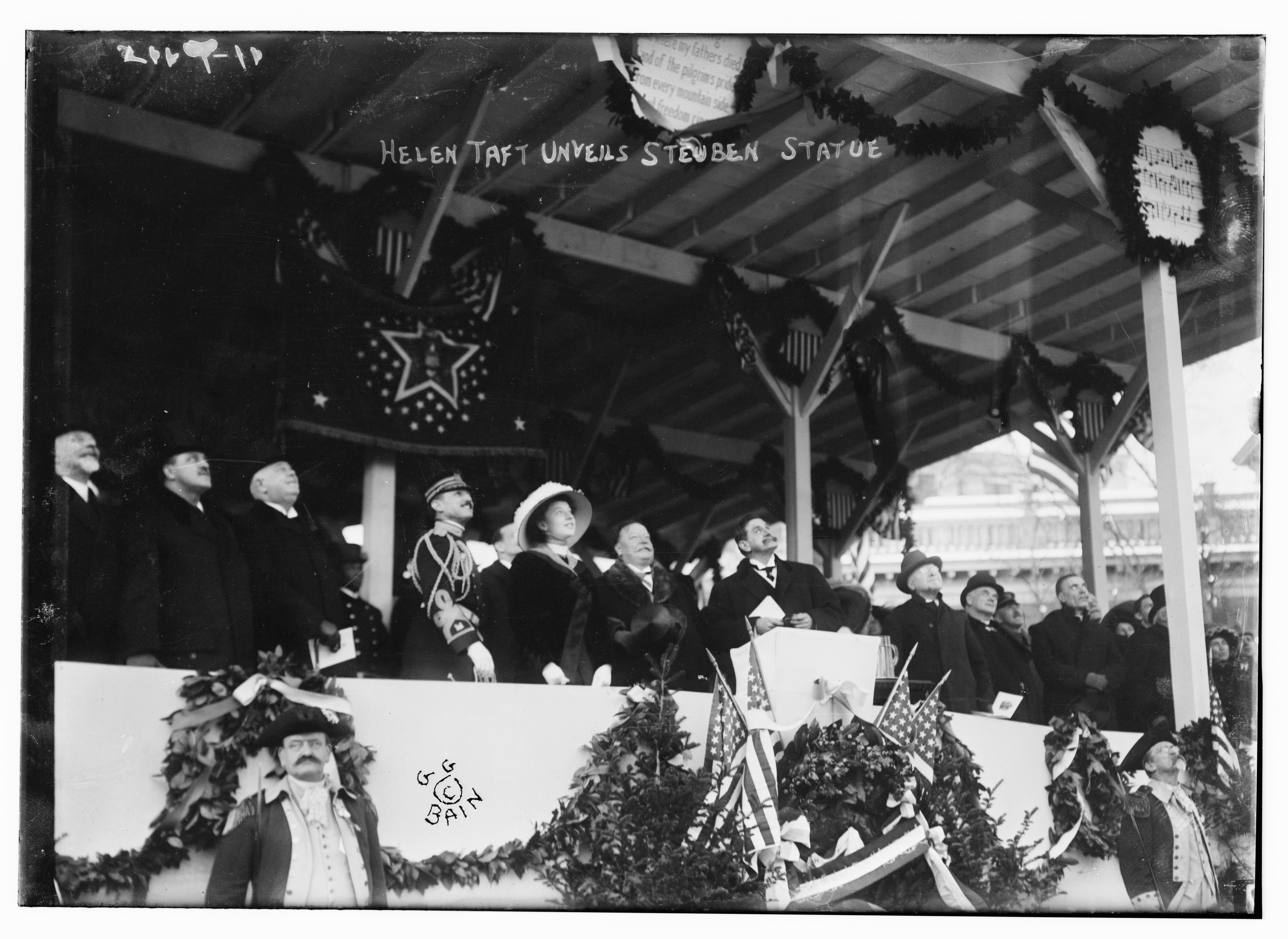
Helen Taft Manning, joins her father President William Howard Taft in the unveiling of the statue

The day the Steuben statue was unveiled and dedicated on December 7, 1910, it was rainy in Washington, D.C., but that did not hamper spirits. One-thousand members of the Northeastern Singers Association (NSA) sang before the ceremony began, which was attended by approximately 10,000 guests of honor and onlookers. The invocation was given by Reverend Charles F. Steck followed by a brief commentary from Secretary of War Jacob M. Dickinson, who served as master of ceremonies. The opening address was given by Representative Richard Bartholdt, who noted the European influences that led Steuben to join the American cause and his actions during the Revolutionary War.

Bartholdt's speech was followed by one from Charles John Hexamer, president of the National German-American Alliance. The NSA sang another song before German Ambassador Johann Heinrich von Bernstorff spoke. Helen Taft Manning, daughter of President William Howard Taft, unveiled the statue as members of German societies and the United States Marine Band sang the U.S. national anthem. Jaeger was introduced to the crowd followed by President Taft giving a speech in praise of Steuben. Reverend William T. Russell led the closing player. Temporary stands were built at the site, where the president and other dignitaries reviewed a parade that included thousands of soldiers and members of the public.

=== Later history ===
A replica of the statue in Washington, D.C., was created at the same time as the original. It was presented to Wilhelm II and the German people in 1911 by the U.S. Congress, and erected on Steuben Square in Potsdam. At the presentation ceremony were Representative Bartholdt and a Mrs. S.B. Wolfram of New York. Bartholdt's speech began with the following: "Your Majesty: By direction of the president of the United States, we have come across the ocean to fulfill the purport of a resolution unanimously adopted by the American congress, providing for the presentation to his majesty, the German emperor, and the German people, of a statue of General von Steuben, a great German and erstwhile citizen and hero of the two continents, as a gift from the American people." The statue was removed by Soviet troops at the end of World War II and East German officials had it melted it down in 1950. A replica was installed in West Berlin in 1987, and after German reunification, another replica was erected near the old location in Potsdam.

The von Steuben statue is one of 14 American Revolution Statuary that were collectively listed on the National Register of Historic Places (NRHP) on July 14, 1978. The statuary was added to the District of Columbia Inventory of Historic Sites (DCIHS) the following year on March 3, 1979. Because of its location on a square planned by Pierre Charles L'Enfant, the statue is a contributing property to the L'Enfant Plan, listed on the NRHP and DCIHS on April 24, 1997, and January 19, 1971, respectively. In addition, the statue is a contributing property to the Lafayette Square Historic District, a National Historic Landmark which was added to the NRHP on August 29, 1970, followed by the DCIHS on June 19, 1973. The statue and surrounding park are owned and maintained by the National Park Service.

There are additional statues honoring Steuben at Valley Forge and Utica, New York, and his birthday is noted by German Americans each year at events in New York, Chicago, and Philadelphia. In 2019, a wreath-laying ceremony took place at the statue, with representatives of LGBT military veterans in attendance.

== Location and design ==
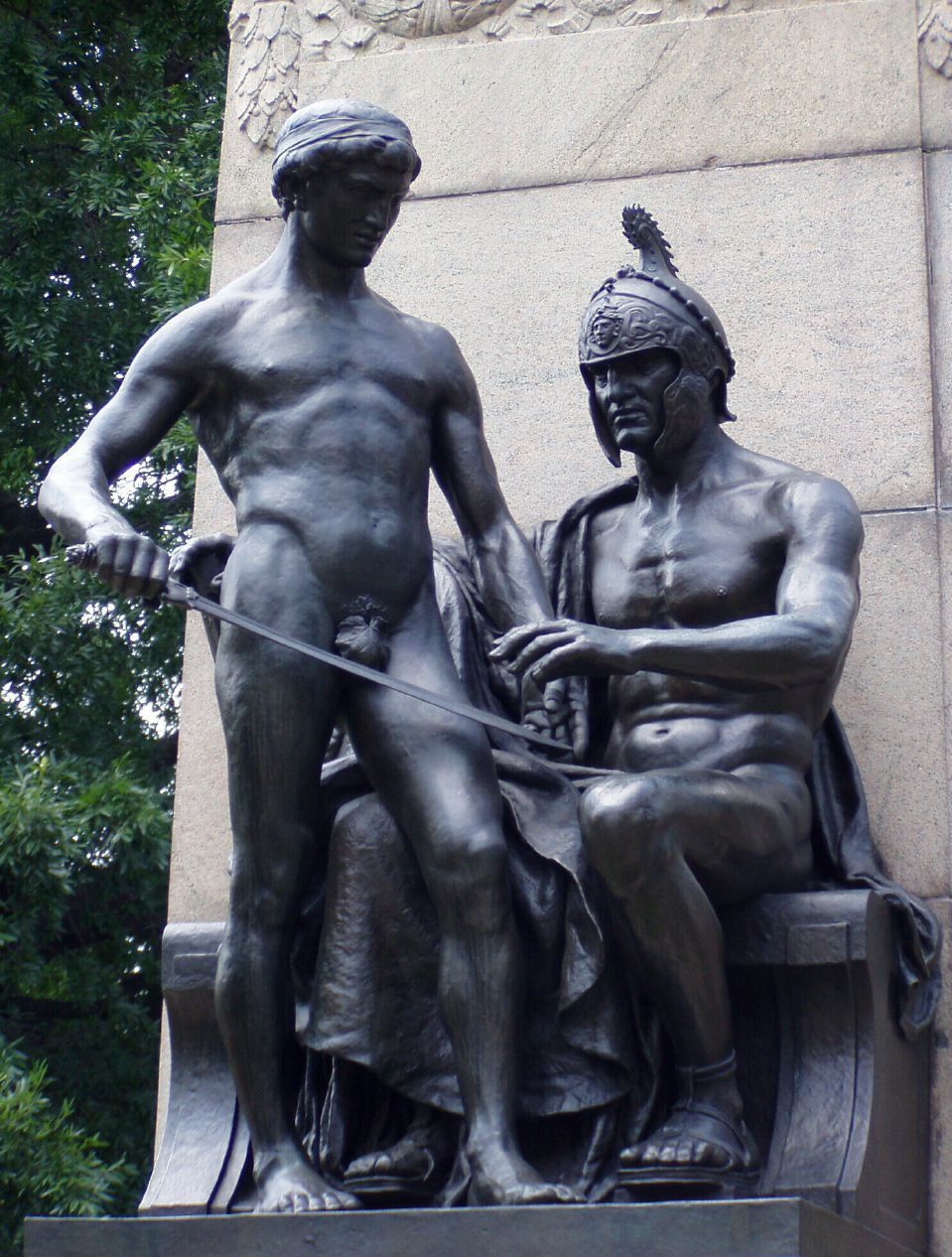
Two male figures on the statue base

The statue is located on the northwest corner of Lafayette Square, near the intersection of Jackson Place and H Street NW in Lafayette Square, Washington, D.C. The remaining foreign sculptures in the square include Comte de Rochambeau, Marquis de Lafayette, and Tadeusz Kościuszko.

The bronze statue, measuring 10 feet tall (3 m), is of a standing Baron von Steuben in Continental Army uniform (with sash, boots, tricorn hat, and cape) looking into the distance while inspecting Continental Army soldiers in 1778. The statue sits atop a square pink granite base measuring 15-feet tall (4.6 m): the front and back feature ornament reliefs, and the left and right have figures in bronze. The base is flanked by two sets of allegorical figures: one to the southwest and the other to the northeast. The figures on the northeast side are two male figures symbolizing military instruction and the figures on the southwestern side are two female figures symbolizing commemoration.

The front of the base has the following inscription (topped by an American eagle):

ERECTED.BY.THE.CONGRESS/OF.THE.VNITED.STATES. TO/FREDERICK.WILLIAM.AVGVSTVS.HENRY.FERDINAND/BARON.VON.STEVBEN/IN.GRATEFVL .RECOGNITION .OF.HIS/SERVICES/TO/THE/AMERICAN.PEOPLE/IN.THEIR.STRVGGLE.FOR.LIBERTY/BORN.IN PRVSSIA/SEPTEMBER 17, 1730/DIED.IN.NEW.YORK./NOVEMBER 28, 1794/AFTER.SERVING.AS AIDE./DE.CAMP.TO.FREDERICK/THE.GREAT.OF PRVSSIA/HE.OFFERED.HIS.SWORD/TO.THE.AMERICAN.COLONIES.AND WAS APPOINT/ED.MAJOR.GENERAL AND/INSPECTOR GENERAL IN/THE CONTINENTAL ARMY/HE GAVE MILITARY.TRAIN-/ING.AND.DISCIPLINE.TO/THE.CITIZEN.SOLDIERS/WHO.ACHIEVED.THE.IN-/DEPENDENCE.OF.THE/VNITED.STATES. ./M.C.M.X

The rear of the base contains profiles in relief of von Steuben's aides-de-camp, Colonel William North and Major Benjamin Walker, and the following inscription:

COLONEL.WILLIAM.NORTH/.MAJOR.BENJAMIN.WALKER/.AIDES.AND.FRIENDS/OF.GENERA.VON.STEVBEN

== See also ==
- List of public art in Washington, D.C., Ward 2
- National Register of Historic Places in Washington, D.C.
- Outdoor sculpture in Washington, D.C.
