= Hexamer (disambiguation) =

A hexamer is a type of oligomer in chemistry and biochemistry that mostly consists of six similar or identical repeating units.

Hexamer may also refer to people with the surname Hexamer:

- Charles John Hexamer (1862–1921) co-founder and president of the National German-American Alliance.
- Ernest Hexamer (1827–1912), German civil engineer and originator of the system of fire insurance maps
- William Hexamer (1825–1870), German revolutionary and participant in the American Civil War
