= Maple Mountain =

Maple Mountain may refer to:

- Maple Mountain (British Columbia)
- Maple Mountain (Maine)
- Maple Mountain (New Hampshire)
- Maple Mountain (Oneida County, New York)
- Maple Mountain (St. Lawrence County, New York)
- Maple Mountain (Ontario)
- Maple Mountain (Washington)
- Spanish Fork Peak, a.k.a. Maple Mountain
