= Friedrich Wilhelm von Steuben =

Prussian-born American military officer (1730–1794)

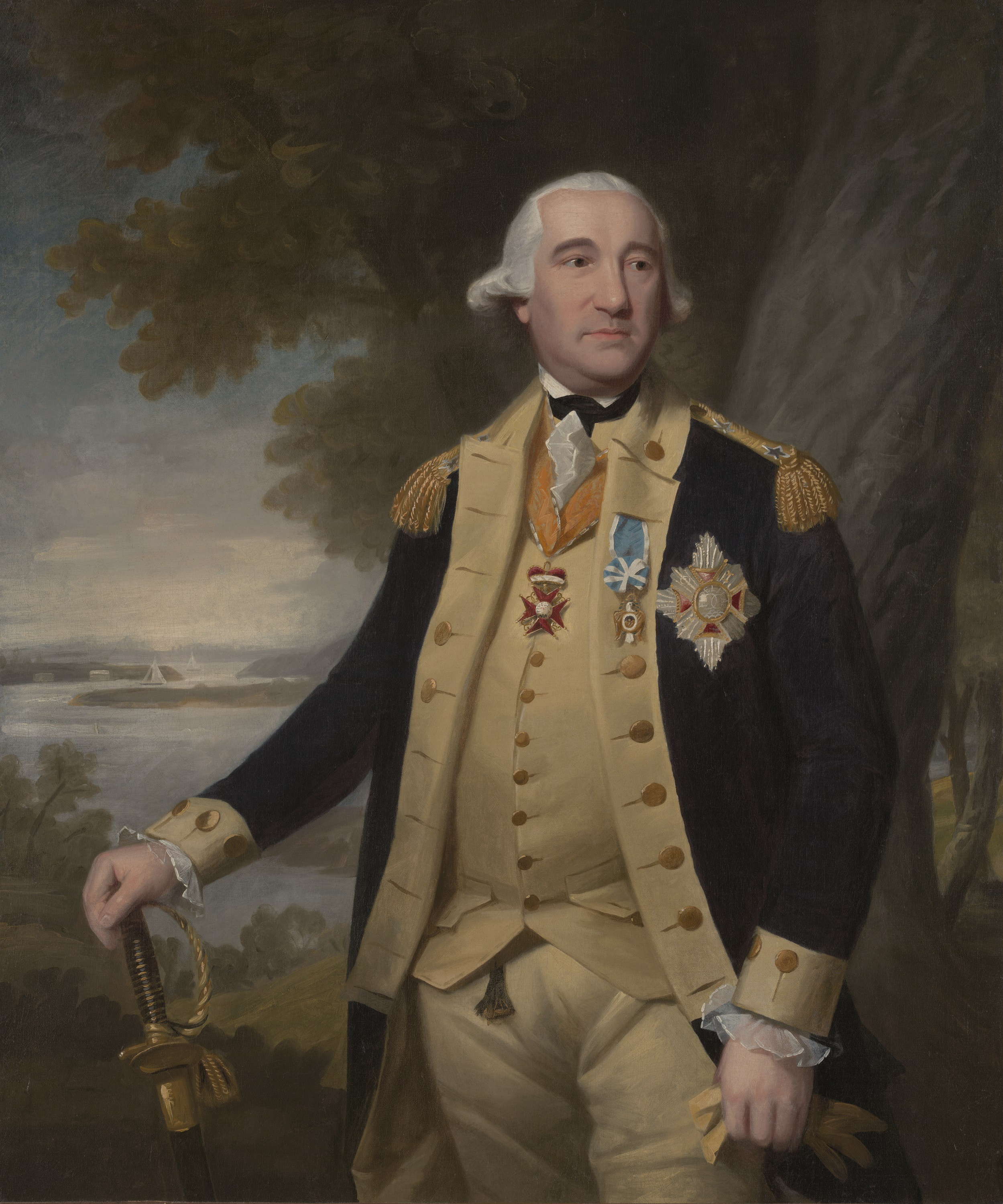
- Portrait by Ralph Earl, c. 1786
- Born: Friedrich Wilhelm August Heinrich Ferdinand Freiherr von Steuben; September 17, 1730; Magdeburg, Prussia
- Died: November 28, 1794 (aged 64); Steuben, New York, U.S.
- Burial place: Steuben Memorial State Historic Site, Remsen, New York, U.S.
- Military career
- Allegiance: Kingdom of Prussia (1744–1762); United States (1778–1783)
- Branch: Prussian Army; Continental Army
- Service years: 1744–1762; 1778–1783
- Rank: Major general
- Nickname: Baron von Steuben
- Conflicts: War of the Austrian Succession; Siege of Prague; Seven Years' War; Siege of Prague; Battle of Kunersdorf; Siege of Kolberg; Siege of Schweidnitz; American Revolutionary War; Valley Forge; Battle of Monmouth; Battle of Blandford; Siege of Yorktown
- Awards: Cross of the Order of De la Fidelite

Friedrich Wilhelm August Heinrich Ferdinand Freiherr von Steuben (/ˈstjuːbən/ STEW-bən or /stjuːˈbɛn/ stew-BEN, German: [ˈfʁiːdʁɪç ˈvɪlhɛlm fɔn ˈʃtɔʏbn̩]; born Friedrich Wilhelm Ludolf Gerhard Augustin Louis Freiherr von Steuben; September 17, 1730 – November 28, 1794), often referred to in English as Baron von Steuben, was a Prussian-born army officer who played a leading role in the American Revolutionary War by reforming the Continental Army into a disciplined and professional fighting force. His contributions marked a significant improvement in the performance of U.S. troops, and he is consequently regarded as one of the fathers of the United States Army.

Born into a military family, Steuben was exposed to war from an early age; at 14 years old, he observed his father directing Prussian engineers in the 1742 siege of Prague. At age 16 or 17, he enlisted in the Prussian Army, which was considered the most professional and disciplined in Europe. During his 17 years of military service, Steuben took part in several battles in the Seven Years' War (1756–1763), rose to the rank of captain, and became aide-de-camp to King Frederick II of Prussia, who was renowned for his military prowess and strategy. Steuben's career culminated in attendance at Frederick's elite school for young military officers, after which he was abruptly discharged from the army in 1763, allegedly by the machinations of a rival.

Steuben spent 11 years as court chamberlain to the prince of Hohenzollern-Hechingen, a small German principality. In 1769, the Duchess of Wurttemberg, a niece of Frederick, named him to the chivalric Order of Fidelity, a meritorious award that conferred the title Freiherr, or 'free lord'; in 1771, his service to Hohenzollern-Hechingen earned him the title baron. In 1775, as the American Revolution had begun, Steuben saw a reduction in his salary and sought some form of military work; unable to find employment in peacetime Europe, he joined the U.S. war effort through mutual French contacts with U.S. diplomats, most notably ambassadors to France Silas Deane and Benjamin Franklin. Due to his military exploits, and his willingness to serve the Americans without compensation, Steuben made a positive impression on both Congress and General George Washington, who appointed him as temporary Inspector General of the Continental Army.

Appalled by the state of U.S. forces, Steuben took the lead in teaching soldiers the essentials of military drills, tactics, and discipline based on Prussian techniques. He wrote Regulations for the Order and Discipline of the Troops of the United States, which remained the army's drill manual for decades, and continues to influence modern U.S. army manuals. Steuben also addressed widespread administrative waste and graft, helping save desperately needed supplies and funds. As these reforms began bearing fruit on the battlefield, in 1778, Congress, on Washington's recommendation, commissioned Steuben to the position of Inspector General with the rank of major general. He served the remainder of the war as Washington's chief of staff and one of his most trusted advisors.

According to Peter Stephen Du Ponceau, Steuben's secretary and interpreter, "The Baron loved to speak of ... his sans culottes, as he called us. Thus the denomination was first invented in America ... when, it could not be foreseen, that the name which honoured the followers of Washington would afterwards be assumed by the satellites of a Marat and a Robespierre".

After the war, Steuben was made a U.S. citizen and granted a large estate in New York in reward for his service. In 1780, he was elected a member of the American Philosophical Society, a learned society that included many of the nation's most prominent Founding Fathers.

== Biography ==
=== Early life and education ===
Baron von Steuben was born in the fortress town of Magdeburg in Prussia (now in Saxony-Anhalt, Germany), on September 17, 1730, the son of Royal Prussian Engineer Capt. Wilhelm von Steuben and his wife, Elizabeth von Jagvodin. When his father entered the service of Empress Anna of Russia, young Friedrich went with him to Crimea and then to Kronstadt, staying until the Russian war against the Turks under General Burkhard Christoph von Münnich. In 1740, Steuben's father returned to Prussia and Friedrich was educated in the garrison towns Neisse and Breslau by Jesuits. Despite his education by a Catholic order, von Steuben remained critical of Catholicism. Originally, von Steuben's family were Protestants in the Kingdom of Prussia, and after his emigration to America he became a member of the Reformed German Church, a congregation in New York. It is said that at age 14 he served as a volunteer with his father in one of the campaigns of the War of the Austrian Succession.

=== Military service ===
==== First military service ====
Baron von Steuben joined the Prussian Army at age 17. He served as a second lieutenant during the Seven Years' War in 1756, and was wounded at the 1757 Battle of Prague. He served as adjutant to the free battalion of General Johann von Mayr and was promoted to first lieutenant in 1759. In August 1759 he was wounded a second time at the Battle of Kunersdorf. In the same year, he was appointed deputy quartermaster at the general headquarters. In 1761 he became adjutant of the Major General Von Knobloch upon being taken prisoner by the Russians at Treptow. He subsequently attained the rank of captain and served as aide-de-camp to Frederick the Great; in 1762 he was one of 13 young officers chosen to participate in a special course of instruction delivered by the king himself.

Upon the reduction of the army at the end of the war, in 1763, Steuben was one of many officers who found themselves unemployed. Towards the end of his life, Steuben indicated in a letter that "an inconsiderate step and an implacable personal enemy" led to his leaving the Prussian army.

==== Service in Hohenzollern-Hechingen ====
In 1765, Steuben became Hofmarschall to Fürst Josef Friedrich Wilhelm of Hohenzollern-Hechingen, a post he held until 1777. In 1769 the Duchess of Württemberg, niece of Frederick the Great, presented him with the Cross of the Order of De la Fidelite. In 1771 he began to use the title baron. That same year he accompanied the prince to France, hoping to borrow money. Failing to find funds, they returned to Germany in 1775, deeply in debt.

In 1763, Steuben had been formally introduced to the future French Minister of War, Claude Louis, Comte de Saint-Germain, in Hamburg. They met again in Paris in 1777. The Count, fully realizing the potential of an officer with Prussian general staff training, introduced him to Americans Silas Deane and Benjamin Franklin. The Americans, however, were unable to offer Steuben a rank or pay in the American army. The Continental Congress had grown tired of foreign mercenaries coming to America and demanding a high rank and pay.

Promoting these men over qualified American officers caused discontent in the ranks. Steuben would have to go to North America strictly as a volunteer and present himself to Congress. Steuben left these first meetings in disgust and returned to Prussia. After unknown events, Steuben was discharged from his position as a captain and traveled to Paris. It is speculated that he was, or was accused of being, homosexual. It is unknown whether or not this occurred, and regardless, no charges were pursued.

Upon the Count's recommendation, Steuben was introduced to future president George Washington by means of a letter from Franklin as a "Lieutenant General in the King of Prussia's service", an exaggeration of his actual credentials that appears to be based on a mistranslation of his service record. He was advanced travel funds and left Europe from Marseille on Friday, September 26, 1777, on board the frigate Flamand.

==== American Revolution ====
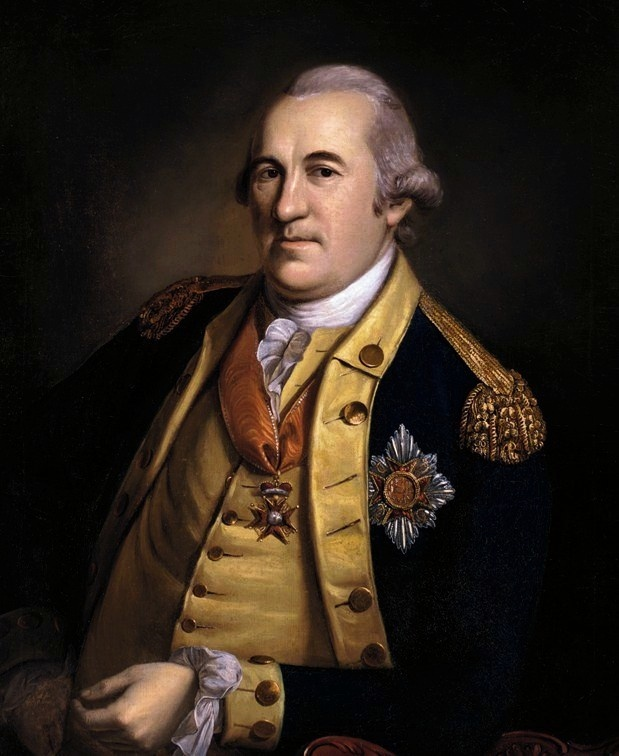
Portrait by Charles Willson Peale, c. 1780

Steuben, his Italian Greyhound Azor (which he took with him everywhere), his young aide-de-camp Louis de Pontière, his military secretary Pierre-Étienne du Ponceau, and two other companions reached Portsmouth, New Hampshire on December 1, 1777. There, they were almost arrested because Steuben and his entourage were wearing red clothing similar to those worn by British troops. They were extravagantly entertained in Boston. On February 5, 1778, Steuben and his party arrived in York, Pennsylvania, where the Continental Congress had relocated after being ousted from Philadelphia by the British advance.

Arrangements were made for Steuben to be paid following the successful completion of the war according to his contributions. He arrived at Valley Forge on February 23, 1778, and reported for duty as a volunteer. One soldier's first impression of the Baron was "of the ancient fabled God of War ... he seemed to me a perfect personification of Mars. The trappings of his horse, the enormous holsters of his pistols, his large size, and his strikingly martial aspect, all seemed to favor the idea. He turned the volunteers into a great army."

===== Inspector General =====
Washington appointed von Steuben as temporary inspector general. He went out into the camp to talk with the officers and men, inspect their huts, and scrutinize their equipment. Steuben established standards of sanitation and camp layouts that would still be standard a century and a half later. There had previously been no set arrangement of tents and huts. Men relieved themselves where they wished, and when an animal died it was stripped of its meat and the rest was left to rot where it lay. Steuben laid out a plan to have rows for command, officers, and enlisted men. Kitchens and latrines were on opposite sides of the camp, with latrines on the downhill side. There was the familiar arrangement of company and regimental streets.

On May 5, 1778, on General Washington's recommendation, Congress appointed Steuben inspector general of the army, with the rank and pay of major general. The internal administration had been neglected, and no books had been kept either as to supplies, clothing, or men. Steuben became aware of the "administrative incompetence, graft, war profiteering" that existed. He enforced the keeping of exact records and strict inspections. His inspections saved the army an estimated loss of 5000 to 8000 muskets.

===== Training program =====
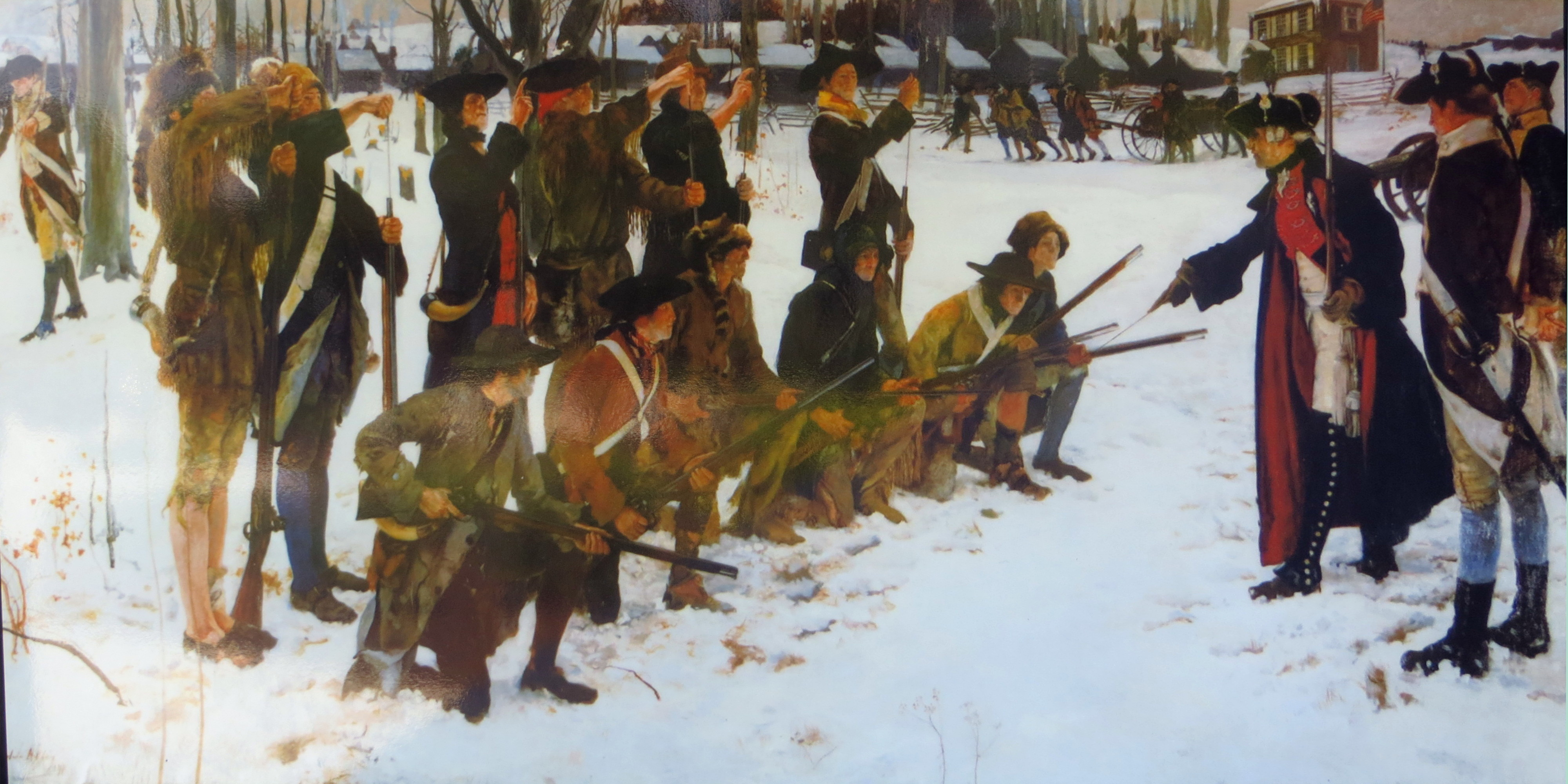
Baron von Steuben Drilling Troops at Valley Forge, by E. A. Abbey (c. 1904), Pennsylvania State Capitol, Harrisburg

Steuben used 120 men of the Commander in Chief's Guard, and used them to demonstrate military training to the rest of the troops. These men, whom Steuben called the "Model Company" in turn trained other personnel at regimental and brigade levels. Steuben's eccentric personality greatly enhanced his mystique. In full military dress uniform, he twice a day trained the soldiers who, at this point, were themselves greatly lacking in proper clothing.

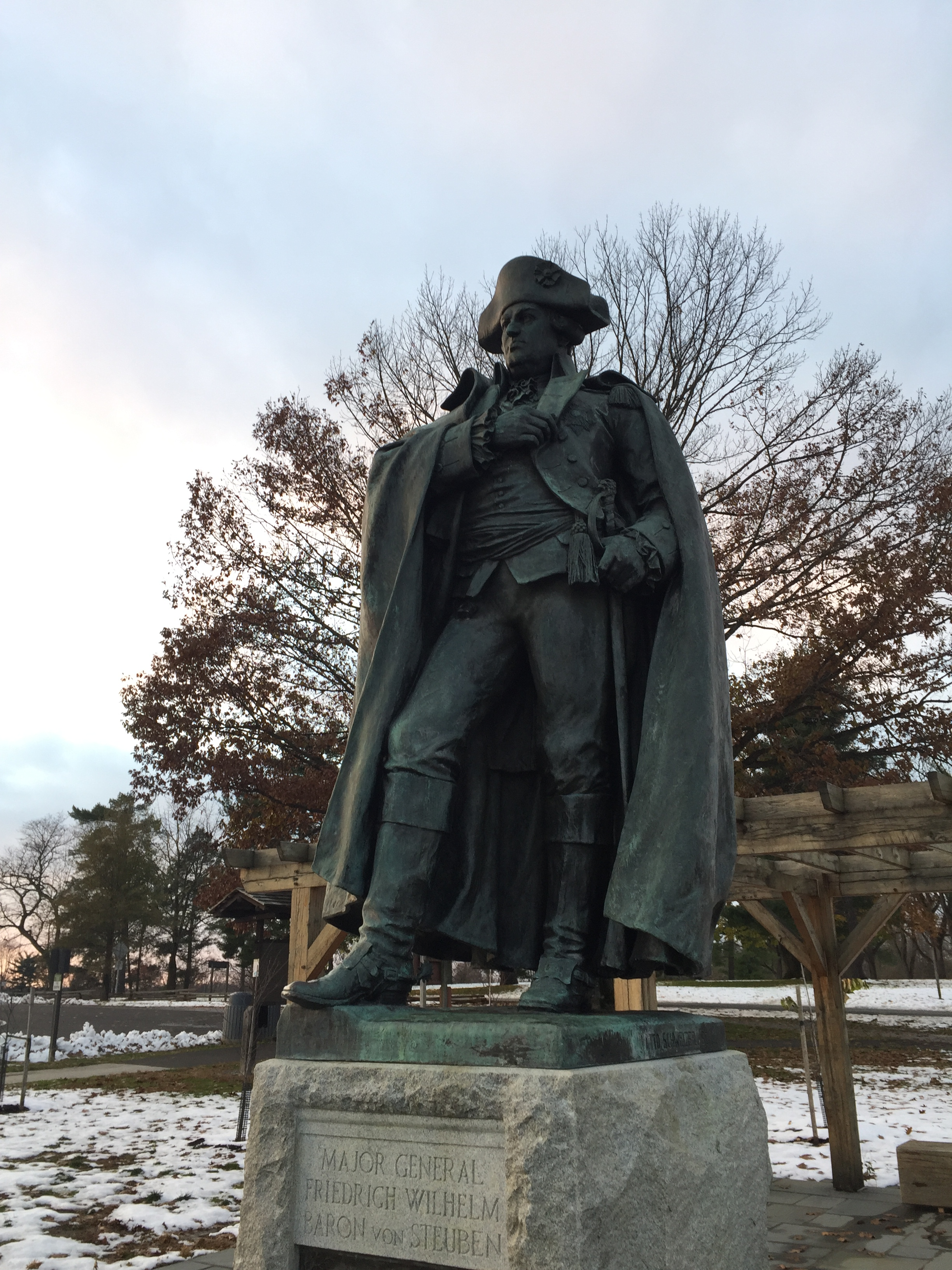
The Steuben Statue in Valley Forge National Historical Park

As he could only speak and write a small amount of English, Steuben originally wrote the drills in French, the military language of Europe at the time. His secretary, Du Ponceau, then translated the drills from French into English, with the help of John Laurens and Alexander Hamilton, two of Washington's aides-de-camp. They did this every single night so the soldiers could practice the next day. Colonel Alexander Hamilton and General Nathanael Greene were of great help in assisting Steuben in drafting a training program for the Army. The Baron's willingness and ability to work with the men, as well as his use of profanity (in several languages), made him popular among the soldiers. It is here he met his close friend and future adopted heir, Captain Benjamin Walker. Within weeks, Walker was Steuben's aide-de-camp.

Steuben introduced a system of progressive training, beginning with the school of the soldier, with and without arms, and going through the school of the regiment. This corrected the previous policy of simply assigning personnel to regiments. Each company commander was made responsible for the training of new men, but actual instruction was done by sergeants specifically selected for being the best obtainable.

Upon Steuben's initial inspection of the camp and soldiers, he remarked that “the American soldier, never having used this arm, had no faith in it, and never used it but to roast his beefsteak." Steuben's introduction of effective bayonet charges became crucial. In the Battle of Stony Point, Continental Army soldiers attacked with unloaded muskets and won the battle solely on Steuben's bayonet training.

The first results of Steuben's training were in evidence at the Battle of Barren Hill, May 20, 1778, and then again at the Battle of Monmouth in June 1778. Steuben, by then serving in Washington's headquarters, was the first to determine that the enemy was heading for Monmouth.

During the winter of 1778–1779, Steuben prepared Regulations for the Order and Discipline of the Troops of the United States, commonly known as the "Blue Book". Its basis was the training plan he had devised at Valley Forge. It was used by the United States Army until 1814, and affected U.S. drills and tactics until the Mexican–American War of 1846.

On May 2, 1779, during the second Middlebrook encampment, a review of the army was held to honor the French minister Conrad Alexandre Gérard de Rayneval and the Spanish diplomat Juan de Miralles. Led by General William Smallwood, four battalions performed precise military formations to demonstrate their mastery of Steuben's training. After the review, about sixty generals and colonels attended a dinner hosted by Steuben in a large tent near his headquarters at the Abraham Staats House.

===== Southern campaign =====
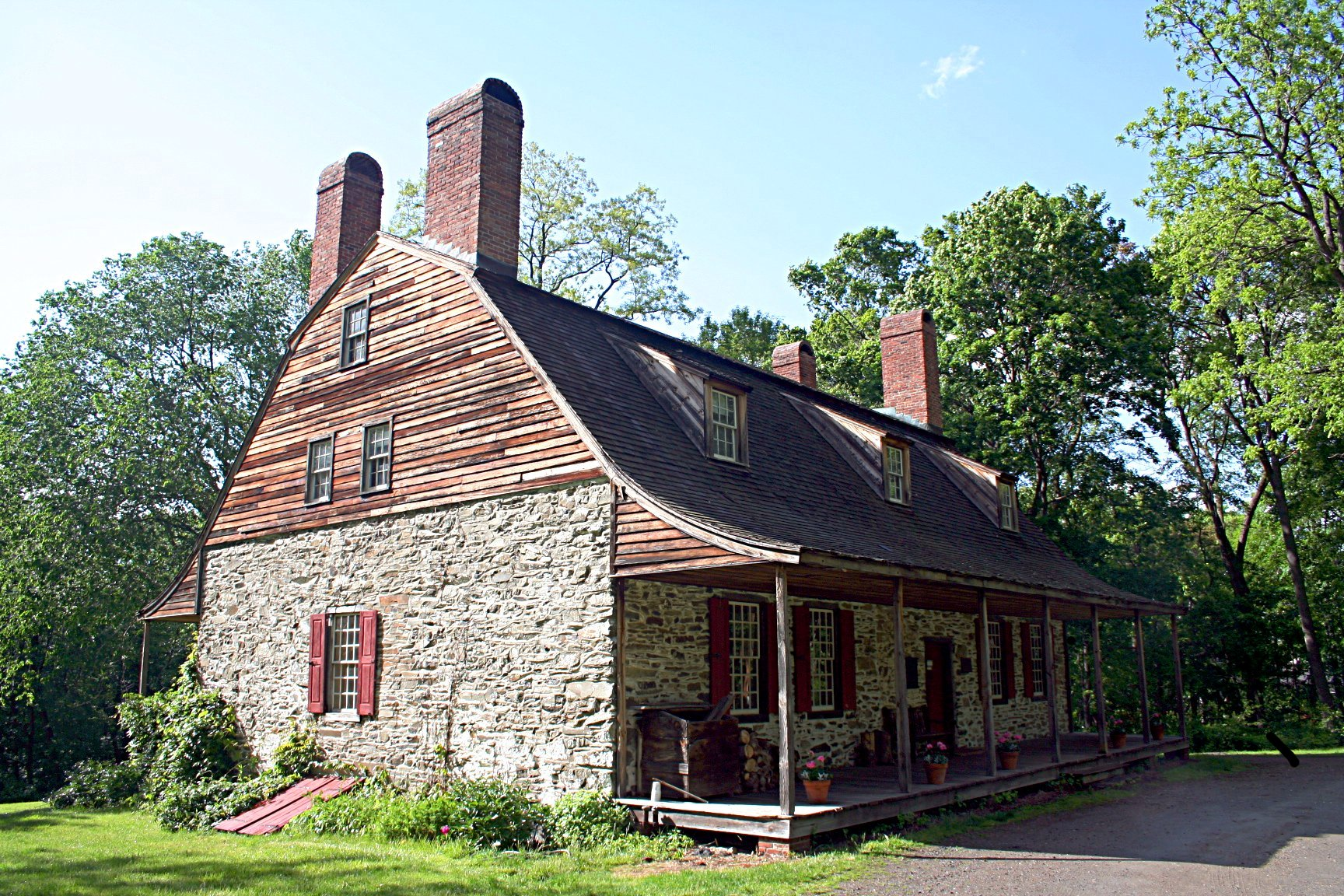
Mount Gulian, Fishkill, NY

In 1780, Steuben sat on the court-martial of British Major John André, captured and charged with espionage in conjunction with the defection of General Benedict Arnold. He later traveled with Nathanael Greene, the new commander of the Southern campaign. He quartered in Virginia, since U.S. supplies and soldiers would be provided to the army from there. Steuben would help in the defense of Virginia with approximately 1,000 militia fighting a delaying action in the Battle of Blandford. During the spring of 1781, he aided Greene in the campaign in the South, culminating in the delivery of 450 Virginia Continentals to Lafayette in June.

He was forced to take sick leave, rejoining the army for the final campaign at Yorktown, where his role was as commander of one of the three divisions of Washington's troops. In 1783, General Von Steuben joined General Knox at Vail's Gate, near West Point, in the fall of 1782 and in early 1783 moved to the Verplanck homestead, at Mount Gulian, across the Hudson River from Washington's headquarters in Newburgh. Steuben gave assistance to Washington in demobilizing the army in 1783 as well as aiding in the defense plan of the new nation. In May 1783, Steuben presided over the founding of the Society of the Cincinnati. He was discharged from the military with honor on March 24, 1784.

==== Final years ====
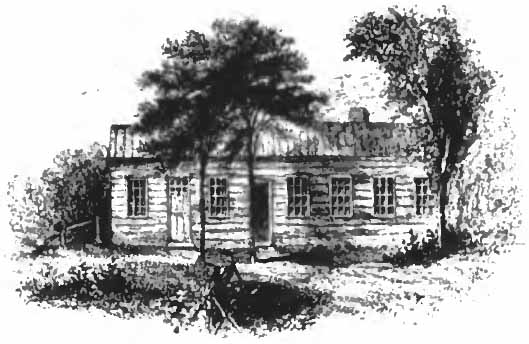
Steuben's log cabin summer residence, Steuben, New York

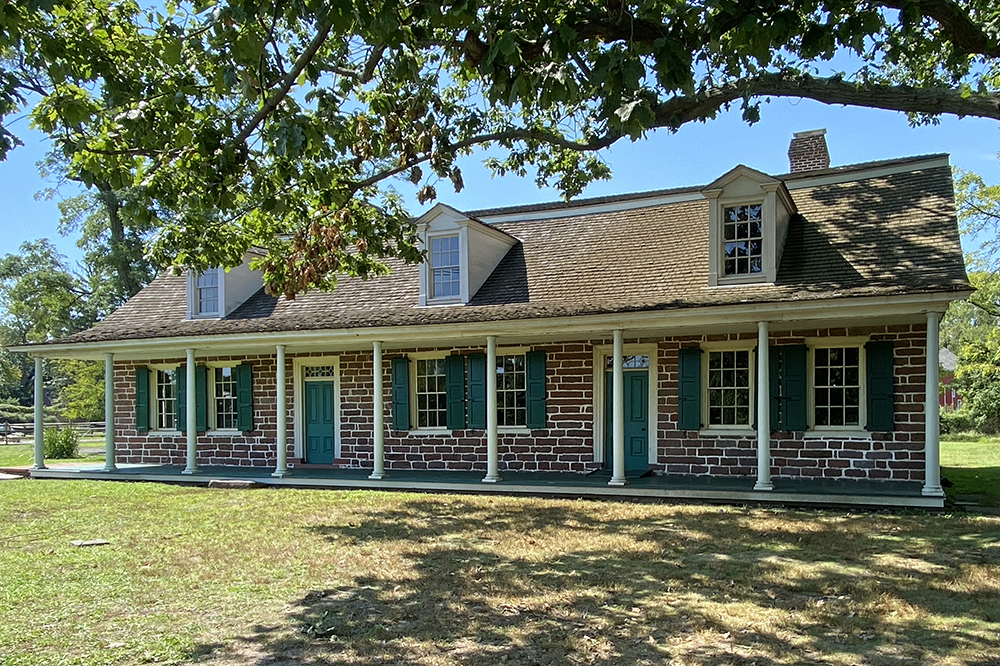
The Steuben House & his "Jersey Estate", c. 1752, enlarged 1767, in situ, at New Bridge Landing

Steuben became a naturalized U.S. citizen by act of the Pennsylvania legislature in March 1784 and later by the New York authorities in July 1786. With the war over, Steuben resigned from service and first settled with his longtime companion, William North, for whom he created a special room on Manhattan Island, where he became a prominent figure and elder in the German Reformed Church. From 1785 until his death in 1794, he served as president of the German Society of the City of New York, a charitable society founded in 1784 to assist German immigrants.

In 1786, during Shays's Rebellion, under the written name "Belisarius", Steuben criticized the Massachusetts government for being an oligarchy.

On December 23, 1783, the state of New Jersey presented him with the use of an estate in Bergen County now known as Steuben House, which had been confiscated from Loyalist Jan Zabriskie in 1781. Located in the formerly strategic New Bridge Landing, the estate included a gristmill and about 40 acres (16 ha) of land. Legislators initially conditioned the grant, requiring Steuben to "hold, occupy and enjoy the said estate in person, and not by tenant."

General Philemon Dickinson of the New Jersey Militia informed Steuben of this gift and responded to his inquiries that

there are on the premises an exceeding good House, an excellent barn, together with many useful outbuildings, all of which I am told, want some repairs... there is... a Grist-mill; a good Orchard, some meadow Ground, & plenty of Wood. The distance from N York by land 15 miles, but you may keep a boat & go from your own door to N York by water – Oysters, Fish & wild fowl in abundance – Possession will be given to you in the Spring, when you will take a view of the premises.

— Philemon Dickinson

Von Steuben spent considerable sums to repair wartime damage to the house and restore its commercial operations under Walker.

On September 5, 1788, the New Jersey Legislature gave Baron von Steuben full title to the former Zabriskie estate. A month later, recognizing his financial embarrassment, Steuben wrote another former aide-de-camp and companion, William North, recognizing: "The Jersey Estate must and is to be sold. Walker is my administrator, all debts are to be paid out of it."

On November 6, 1788, Steuben again wrote North (at his new home in Duanesburg, New York), noting "My Jersey Estate is Advertised but not yet Sold, from this Walker Shall immediately pay to you the money, you so generously lend me and all my debts in New-York will be payed. [sic] I support my present poverty with more heroism than I Expected. All Clubs and parties are renounced, I seldom leave the House." Steuben eventually sold the New Jersey property to a son of the previous owner, and it remained in the Zabriskie family until 1909. It is the only remaining eighteenth-century building that von Steuben owned.

Von Steuben was present at the first inauguration of George Washington in New York in 1789.

Von Steuben moved upstate and settled in Oneida County on a small estate in the vicinity of Rome, New York, on land granted to him for his military service and where he had spent summers. He was later appointed a regent for what evolved into the University of the State of New York. In 1790, Congress awarded him a pension of $2,500 a year, which he kept until his death.

==== Death ====
Von Steuben died on November 28, 1794, at his estate in Oneida County, and was buried in a grove at what became the Steuben Memorial State Historic Site. The estate became part of the town of Steuben, New York, which was named for him.

== Personal life ==
=== Alleged homosexuality and relationships ===
Von Steuben is believed by some historical journalists to have been gay. Von Steuben had arrived in the United States with his 17-year-old secretary and (then speculated to be) lover, Peter Stephen Du Ponceau. In Prussia, he may have had numerous relationships with young soldiers, and also with Prince Henry of Prussia and Frederick the Great. At Valley Forge, he began close relationships with Walker and William North, then both military officers in their 20s. Von Steuben formally adopted Walker and North and made them his heirs. Some consider this action an indication of Von Steuben's homosexuality, as some gay men of the time period would use adoption as a substitution for marriage, to establish a recognized legal relationship and a legal connection to heirs.

He never married and had no children, and he did not care much for his European relatives. Thus, he left his estate to his companions and aides-de-camp, Walker and North, with whom he had had an "extraordinarily intense emotional relationship ... treating them as surrogate sons." A third young man, John W. Mulligan (1774–1862), the son of Hercules Mulligan, who also considered himself one of von Steuben's "sons", inherited his vast library, collection of maps and $2,500 in cash (equivalent to $54,000 in 2025). In his 1781 will, he left the majority of his estate to his nephew, as long as he would move permanently to the United States and reject the title of baron or any other title of nobility. (From Paul Lockhart's book.) Following von Steuben's death, North divided the property bequeathed to him among his military companions.

== Legacy ==
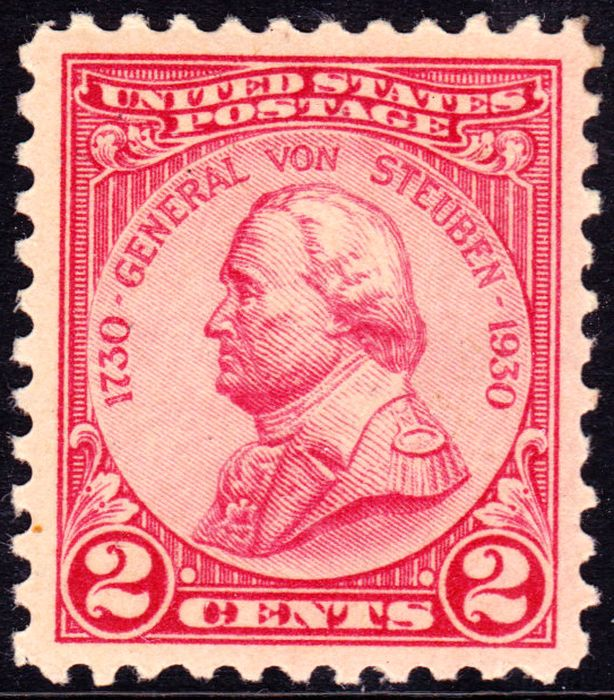
General Von Steuben on a two-cent postage stamp, 1930 issue

Generally, Von Steuben Day takes place in September in many cities throughout the United States. It is often considered the German American event of the year. Participants march, dance, wear German costumes and play German music, and the event is attended by millions of people. The German-American Steuben Parade is held annually in September in New York City. It is one of the largest parades in the city and is traditionally followed by an Oktoberfest in Central Park as well as celebrations in Yorkville, Manhattan, a historically German section of New York City. The German-American Steuben Parade has been taking place since 1958.

Chicago hosts a von Steuben Day parade, which is featured in the U.S. film Ferris Bueller's Day Off. Philadelphia hosts a smaller Steuben Parade in the Northeast section of the city.

The Steuben Society was founded in 1919 as "an educational, fraternal, and patriotic organization of American citizens of German background". In the difficult post-World War I years the Society helped the German-American community to reorganize. It is now one of the largest organizations for Americans of German descent.

A warship, a submarine, and an ocean liner (later pressed into military service) were named in von Steuben's honor. In World War I, the captured German ship SS Kronprinz Wilhelm was renamed as USS Von Steuben. In World War II there was the Dampfschiff General von Steuben, an ill-fated German luxury passenger ship which was turned into an armed transport ship during the war. During the Cold War, the U.S. Navy Fleet Ballistic Missile (FBM) submarine USS Von Steuben was named for him.

Several locations in the United States are named Steuben, most of them in his honor. Examples include Steuben County, New York, Steuben County, Indiana, and the city of Steubenville, Ohio. Steuben Hill is named after him. Several buildings are named for Steuben, among them Von Steuben Metropolitan High School in Chicago, Illinois, and one of the cadet barracks buildings at Valley Forge Military College.

Von Steuben was one of four European military leaders who assisted the U.S. cause during the Revolution and was honored with a statue in Lafayette Square, just north of the White House, in Washington, D.C. The statue by Albert Jaegers was dedicated in 1910. A copy was dedicated in Potsdam, Germany, in 1911, and destroyed during World War II. A new cast was given in honor of German-American friendship in 1987, and to celebrate the 750th anniversary of the founding of Berlin. It was installed in the Dahlem district, in what had been the U.S. sector of the formerly divided city.

A cast is in Steuben's home town of Magdeburg. Statues of Steuben by J. Otto Schweizer can be found in Valley Forge, Pennsylvania, and Utica, New York, in addition to an equestrian statue by Schweizer in Milwaukee, Wisconsin. A bust of Steuben is in the garden of the German Embassy in Washington, D.C.

The Steuben House, presented to Steuben as a gift for his services in the Continental Army, is located at New Bridge Landing in River Edge, New Jersey. The house and surrounding farmland were seized in 1781 from a Loyalist family. The house looks much as it did after Steuben renovated it. The State of New Jersey took possession of the historic mansion and one acre of ground for $9,000 in June 1928. It was opened as a public museum in September 1939. The Bergen County Historical Society opens the building for special events. It is under the jurisdiction of the Historic New Bridge Landing Park Commission. It was added to the National Register of Historic Places in December 1970, for its significance in architecture and military history.

The Hotel von Steuben was a United States Armed Forces Recreation Center (AFRC) Europe hotel located in Garmisch-Partenkirchen, Bavaria, Germany. The property entered U.S. military use in 1954 and served as a holiday and rest facility for members of the U.S. Armed Forces, before closing in 2004 following the opening of the Edelweiss Lodge and Resort.

Franciscan University of Steubenville honors their city's namesake by having The Barons as their moniker and mascot.

Other tributes include Steuben Field, the stadium of the Hamilton College football team. Von Steuben, acting as Alexander Hamilton's surrogate, laid the cornerstone of the school.

Depictions of Steuben in popular U.S. media include portrayals by Nehemiah Persoff in the 1979 U.S. TV miniseries The Rebels, Kurt Knudson in the 1984 TV miniseries George Washington, being voiced by Austrian-American Arnold Schwarzenegger in the animated series Liberty's Kids, and by David Cross on the "Philadelphia" episode of Drunk History.

In 2007, a popular documentary DVD was released by LionHeart FilmWorks and director Kevin Hershberger titled Von Steuben's Continentals: The First American Army. The 60-minute, live-action documentary details the uniforms, camp life, food, weapons, equipment, and drill of the Continental soldier from 1775 to 1781, as taught and developed by Baron von Steuben.

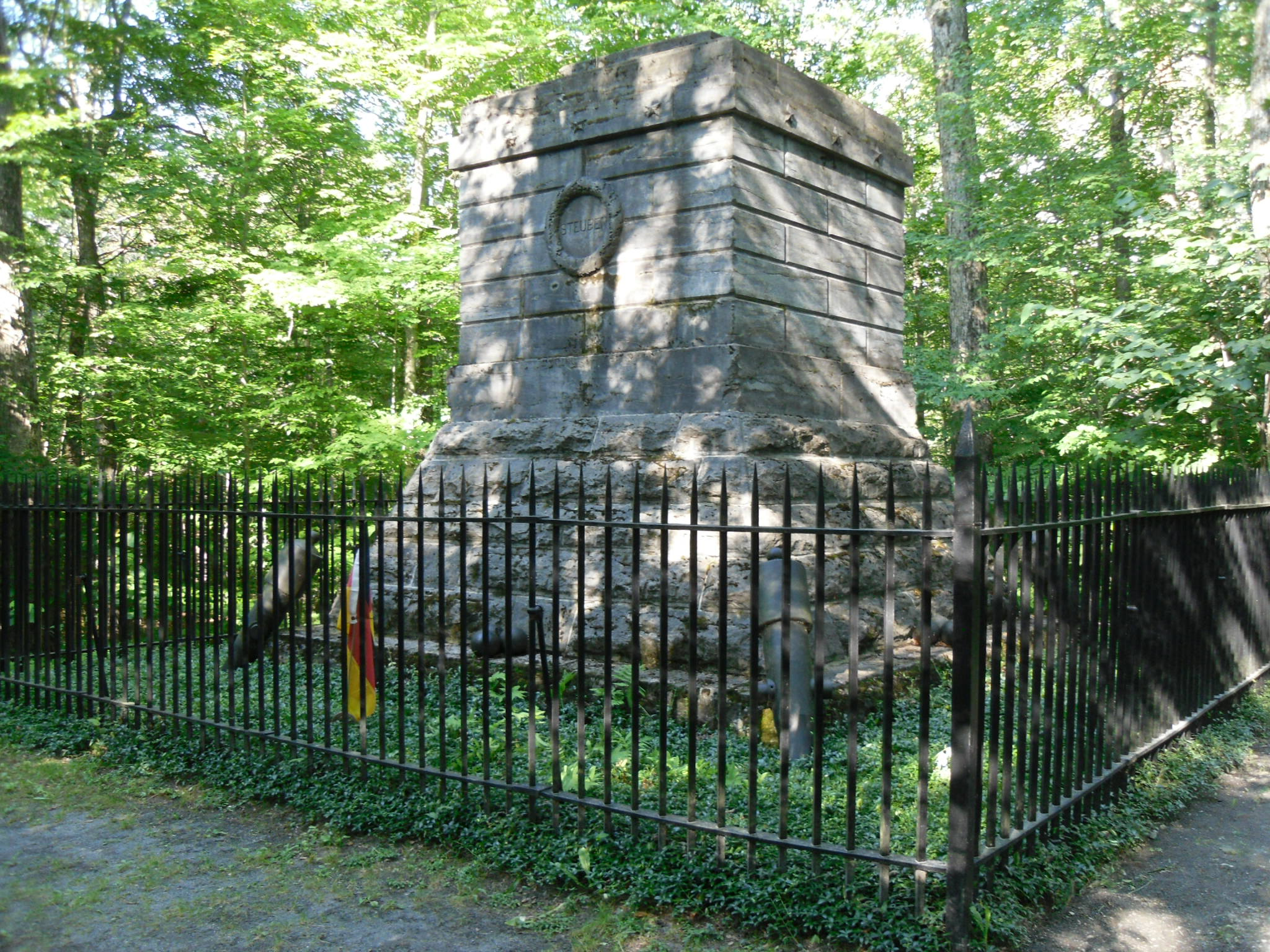
Steuben's grave, Steuben, New York

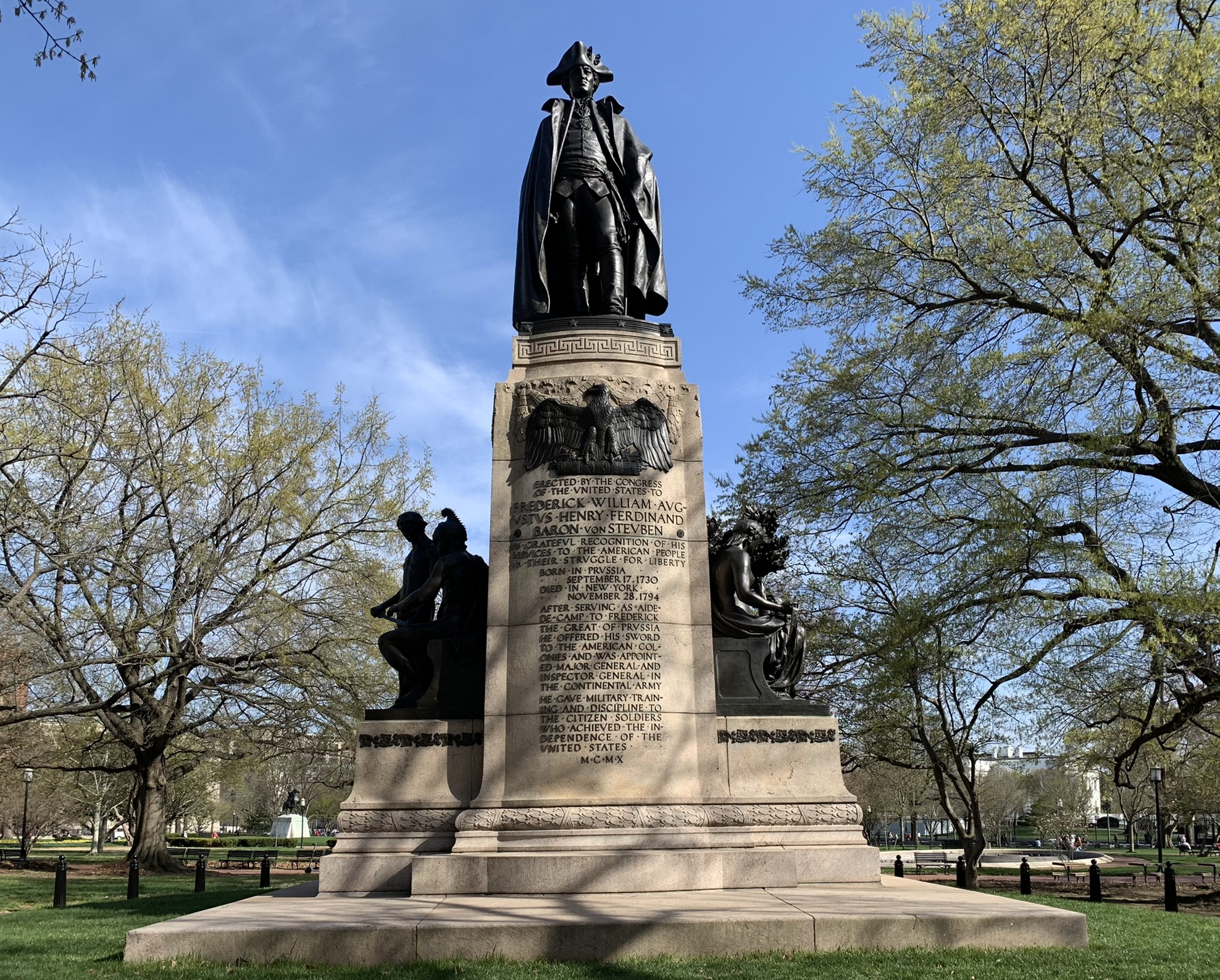
Baron von Steuben (1910), Albert Jaegers, sculptor, Lafayette Square, Washington, D.C.

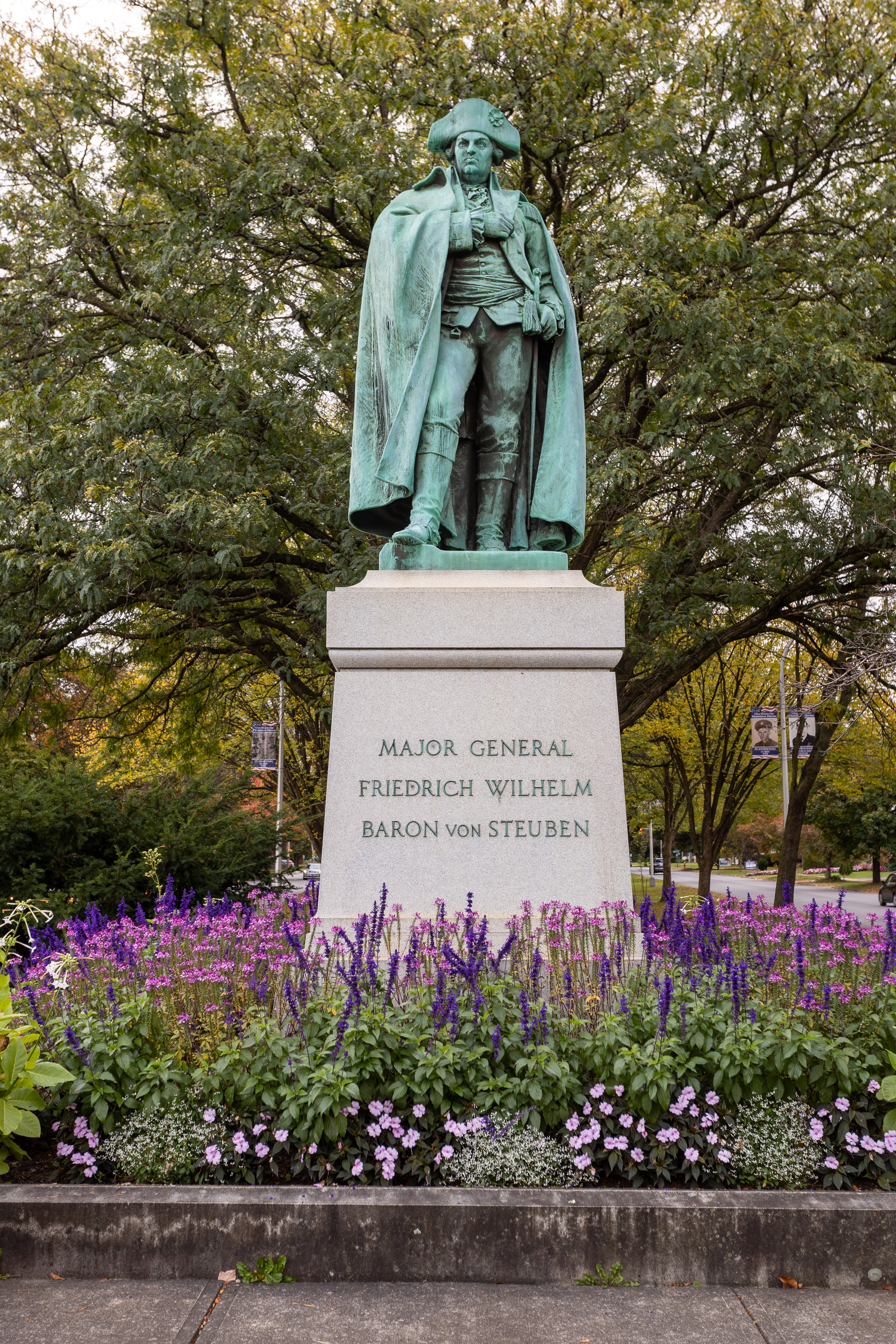
Baron von Steuben (1914), J. Otto Schweizer, sculptor, Memorial Parkway, Utica, New York.

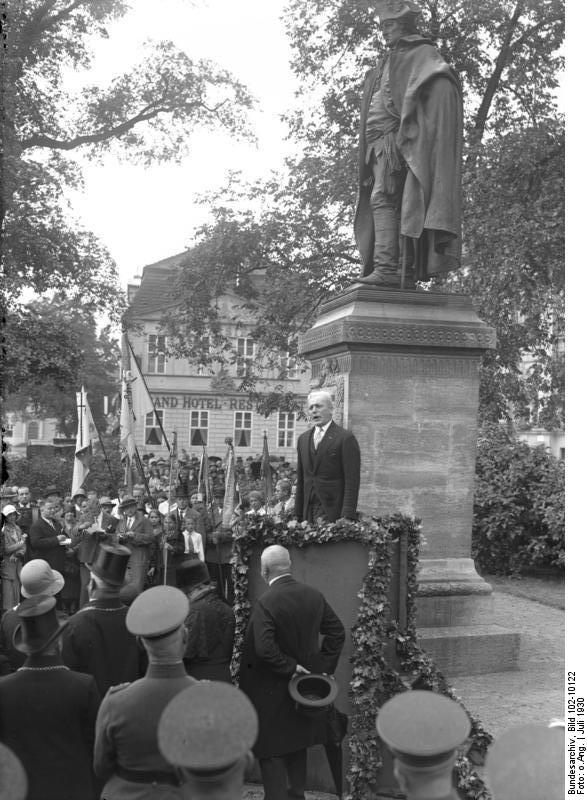
Steubendenkmal (1911), Steubenplatz, Potsdam, Germany. A replica of the 1910 Washington, D.C. statue.

== See also ==
- Regulations for the Order and Discipline of the Troops of the United States
- American Revolutionary War#American strategy
- Drunk History Season 2 Episode 8 Philadelphia as retold by Nick Rutherford features David Cross as Baron von Steuben

== Sources ==
- Palmer, John McAuley (1937). General Von Steuben. Yale University Press.
- Danckert, Stephen C. "Baron von Steuben and the Training of Armies." Military Review 74 (1994): 29–34 in EBSCO
- Steuben Papers, NYHS
- The Historic Society of Pennsylvania, Simon Gratz Collection (#250), Case 4, Box 13 William North /Benjamin Walker Letters
- Guide to the Friedrich Wilhelm von Steuben Papers at the New-York Historical Society

Military offices
| Preceded by Thomas Conway | Inspector General of the U.S. Army; May 5, 1778 – April 15, 1784 | Succeeded by William North |
