= Penn Mountain =

Mountain in United States of America

- Location within New York

Highest point
- Elevation: 1,808 feet (551 m)
- Coordinates: 43°22′46″N 75°15′36″W

Geography
- Location: W of East Steuben, New York, U.S.
- Topo map: USGS Boonville

Penn Mountain is a 1,808-foot-tall (551 m) mountain in the Tug Hill region of New York. It is located west of East Steuben in the town of Steuben in Oneida County. The mountain is the former site of an 80-foot-tall (24 m) steel fire lookout tower. The tower later ceased fire lookout operations and was removed in 1976.

== History ==
In 1950, the Conservation Department built an 80-foot-tall (24 m) Aermotor LS40 steel tower on the mountain. The tower went into service in 1951, reporting no fires and 4 visitors. The tower ceased fire lookout operations in 1971. The tower reopened briefly in 1974 to provide early detection to an area that suffered heavy wind damage near Forestport. The tower then closed again before being removed in 1976.
