= Prix Volney =

Award given by the Institute of France

The Prix Volney (English: Volney Medal) is awarded by the Institute of France after proposition by the Académie des Inscriptions et Belles-Lettres to a work of comparative philology.

The prize was founded in 1822 in memory of count Volney and was originally a gold medal worth 1,200 francs.

== Recipients include ==
- Nicolas Massias (1828)
- Jean-Pierre Darrigol (1829)
- Peter Stephen DuPonceau, Mémoire sur le systeme grammatical des langues de quelques nations Indiennes de l'Amérique du Nord ((in English) Study of the grammatical systems of some North American Indian languages) (1838)
- Theodor Benfey, Lexicon of Greek Roots
- Eugène Burnouf
- Ernest Renan, General History of Semitic Languages (1847)
- Albin de Chevallet, Études philologiques et historiques sur l'origine et la formation de la langue française ((in English) Philological and historical study on the origin and formation of the French language) (1850)
- Sigismund Koelle, Polyglotta Africana (1856)
- Count Franz Xaver von Miklosisch, Vergleichende Formenlehre ders slavischen Sprachen ((in English) Teaching comparative forms in Slavic languages) (1857)
- L.-F. Meunier, Les Composés qui contiennent un verbe à un mode personnel en latin, en français, en italien et en espagnol ((in English) Compositions containing reflexive verbs in Latin, French, Italian and Spanish) (1873)
- Robert Caesar Childers A Dictionary of the Pali Language (1876)
- Johann Gottlieb Christaller, work on the Twi language (1876, 1882)
- James Schön, work on the Hausa language (1877)
- Christian Garnier, Méthode de Transcription rationnelle générale des Noms géographiques (1898)
- Antoine Meillet Recherches sur le génitif-accusatif en vieux slave (1898)
- Otto Jespersen, Growth and Structure of the English Language (1906)
- Albert Cuny twice: Le nombre duel en grec (1907) et Études prégrammaticales sur le domaine des langues indo-européennes et chamito-sémitiques (1920)
- Édouard Bourciez, Éléments de linguistique romane (1910)
- Marcel Cohen, twice: 1913 for Le Parler arabe des juifs d'Alger and 1925, Le Système verbal sémitique et l'expression du temps
- Jules Bloch, twice: La formation de la langue marathe in 1914 and L'Indo-aryen du Véda jusqu'aux temps présents in 1935
- Gustave Guillaume, Le problème de l'article et sa solution dans la langue française (1917)
- Albert Dauzat, Les argots de métiers franco-provençaux (1919)
- Milivoj Pavlovic, Le langage enfantin: acquisition du serbe et du français par un enfant serbe (1921)
- Jean Deny, Grammaire de la langue turque (dialecte osmanli) (1922)
- Lucien Tesnière, Les formes du duel en slovène (1926)
- Albert Sechehaye, Essai sur la structure logique de la phrase (1927)
- André Vaillant, La langue de Dominko Zlataric, poète ragusain de la fin du XVIe siècle (1929)
- René Lafon, Le système du verbe basque au XVI^{e} siècle et Le système des formes verbales à auxiliaire dans les principaux textes basques du XVI^{e} siècle (1945)
- Gilbert Lazard (1964)
- Antoine Grégoire, L'apprentissage du langage (1937)
- Claude Hagège (1981)

== See also ==
- Prix Volney - Wikipedia, in French
