= Claude Hagège =

French linguist

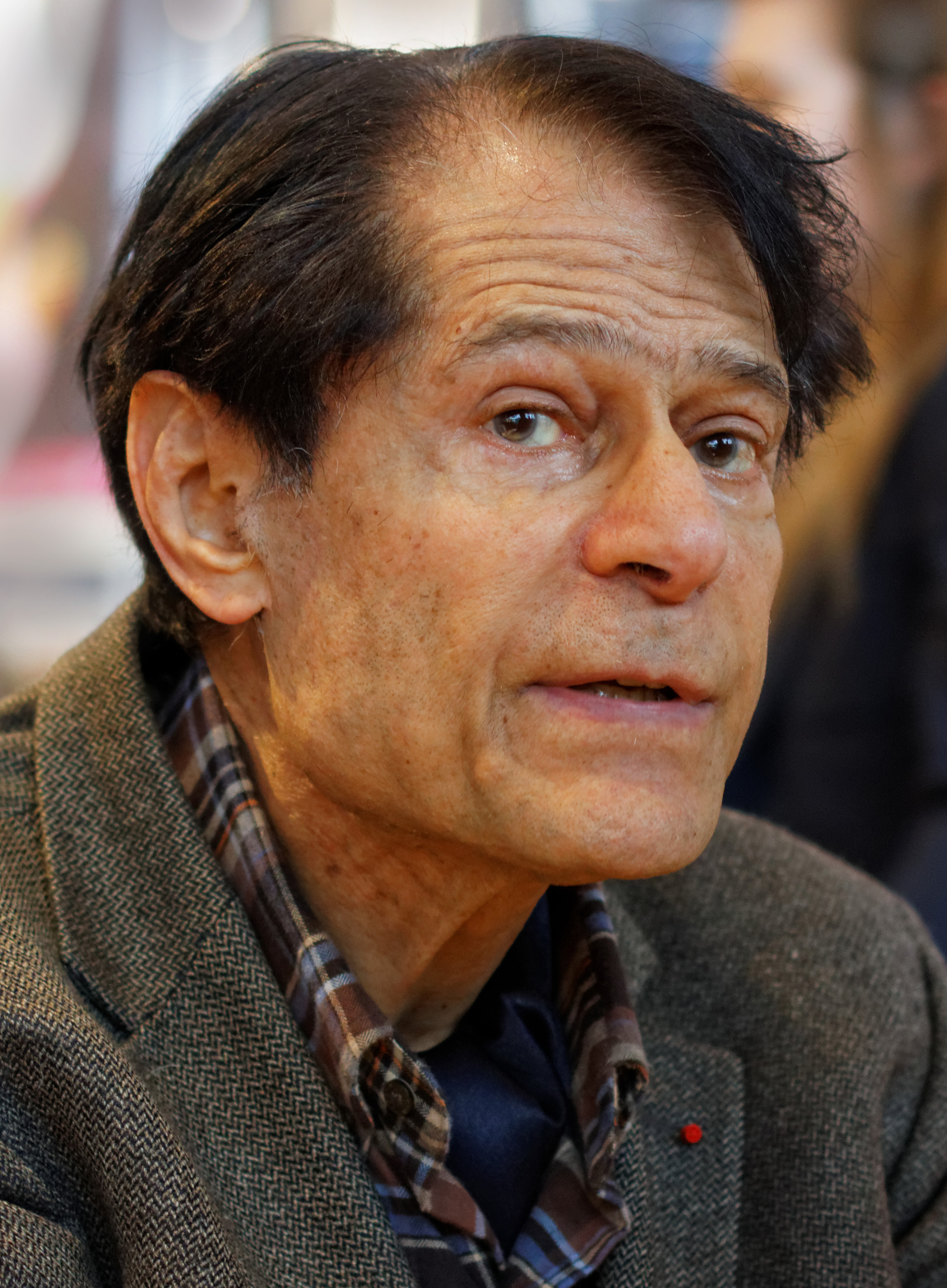
- Born: 1 January 1936 (age 90); Carthage, Tunisia
- Education: Lycée Louis-le-Grand; École Normale Supérieure
- Writing career
- Language: French
- Website: claude.hagege.free.fr

Claude Hagège (French: [aʒɛʒ]; born 1 January 1936) is a French linguist.

== Biography ==
He was elected to the Collège de France in 1988 and received several awards for his work, including the Prix de l'Académie Française and the CNRS Gold medal. Famous for being a polyglot, he speaks (or is knowledgeable about) fifty languages, including Italian, English, Arabic, Chinese, Hebrew, Russian, Greek, Guarani, Hungarian, Navajo, Nocte, Punjabi, Persian, Malay, Hindi, Malagasy, Fula, Quechua, Tamil, Tetela, Turkish and Japanese.

== Publications ==
- La Langue mbum de nganha cameroun - phonologie - grammaire, Paris, Klincksieck, 1970
- Le Problème linguistique des prépositions et la solution chinoise, Paris, Société de linguistique de Paris, 1975
- La Phonologie panchronique, Paris, PUF, 1978
- Le Comox lhaamen de Colombie britannique : présentation d'une langue amérindienne. Amerindia, numéro spécial, Paris, Association d'Ethnolinguistique Amérindienne, 1981
- La Structure des langues, Paris, PUF, 1982
- L'Homme de paroles, Paris, Fayard, 1985
- L'Homme de paroles : contribution linguistique aux sciences humaines, Paris, Fayard, 1985
- Le Français et les siècles, Éditions Odile Jacob, 1987
- Le Souffle de la langue : voies et destins des parlers d'Europe, Amsterdam, John Benjamins, 1992
- The Language Builder: an Essay on the Human Signature in Linguistic Morphogenesis, 1992
- L'Enfant aux deux langues, Éditions Odile Jacob, 1996
- Le français, histoire d'un combat, Paris, Le Livre de Poche, 1996
- Halte à la mort des langues, Paris, Odile Jacob, 2000
- Combat pour le français : au nom de la diversité des langues et des cultures, Paris, Odile Jacob, 2006
- Dictionnaire amoureux des langues, Paris, Plon/Odile Jacob, 2009
- Contre la pensée unique, Paris, Odile Jacob, 2012
- Les religions, la parole, la violence, Paris, Odile Jacob, 2017.
- Le linguiste et les langues, Paris, CNRS, 2019.

== Awards and honours ==
=== Awards ===
- 1981 : Prix Volney
- 1986 : Grand Prix de l'Essai de la Société des Gens de Lettres for L'Homme de paroles
- 1986 : Prix de l'Académie Française for L'Homme de paroles
- 1995 : CNRS Gold medal

=== National honours ===
Ribbon bar	Honour	Date
	Knight of the Legion of Honour	2006
	Officer of the Ordre des Palmes Académiques	1995
	Knight of the Ordre des Arts et des Lettres	1995
