= Steuben Memorial State Historic Site =

- Baron von Steuben Memorial Site
- U.S. National Register of Historic Places
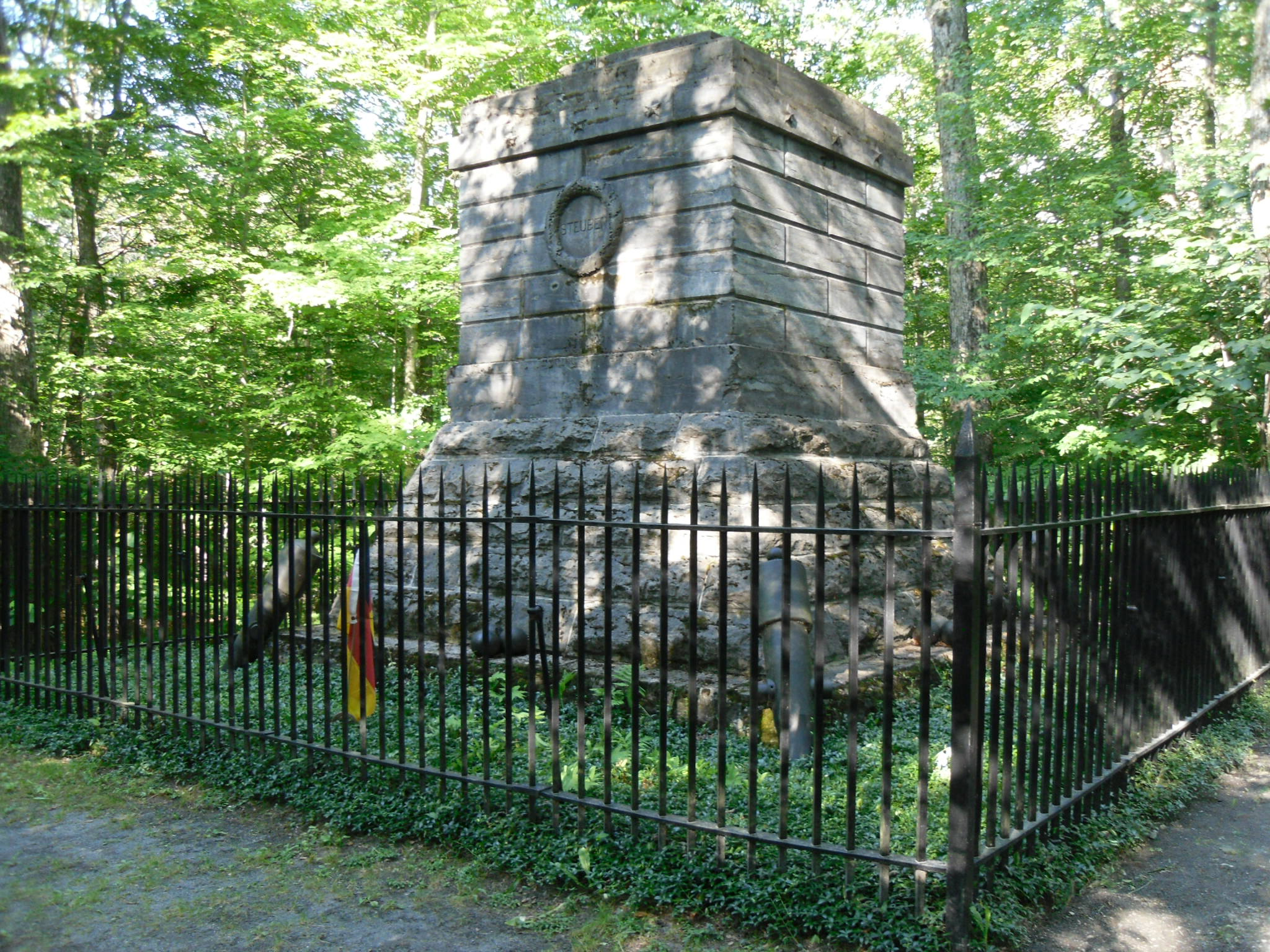
- Baron von Steuben Monumental Tomb, July 2010

- Location within New York Location within the United States
- Location: Starr Hill Road, Remsen, New York
- Coordinates: 43°20′18.46″N 75°13′56.75″W
- Area: 53 acres (21 ha)
- Built: 1862
- Architect: Multiple
- NRHP reference No.: 09000635
- Added to NRHP: September 22, 1983

The Steuben Memorial State Historic Site is a historic location in the eastern part of Steuben, Oneida County, New York, that honors Baron von Steuben, the "Drillmaster of the American Revolution". The land in this part of Oneida County was part of a 16,000-acre (6,500 ha) land grant made to von Steuben for his services to the United States. He used the land for his summer residence, and is buried at the memorial, a "Sacred Grove".

The site includes the memorial tomb and reconstructed log cabin (1937) and several smaller elements, including a stone bearing a memorial plaque, a series of historic markers, and a landscaping structure. The site also offers a picnic area, scenic views, tours, re-enactments, educational assistance, and demonstrations.

It was listed on the National Register of Historic Places in 2009.

== See also ==
- List of New York State Historic Sites
