= Bowen Hill =

Mountain in New York, United States

- Location within New York Location within the United States

Highest point
- Elevation: 1,765 feet (538 m)
- Coordinates: 43°22′02″N 75°16′35″W,43°22′30″N 75°17′48″W

Geography
- Location: NW of Steuben, New York, U.S.
- Topo map: USGS North Western

Bowen Hill is a small mountain chain made of two summits, the highest being 1765 feet. The summits are located in Central New York Region of New York located in the Town of Steuben in Oneida County, northwest of Steuben.
