= Ernest Hexamer =

Civil engineer

Ernst Emil Julius Ferdinand Hexamer
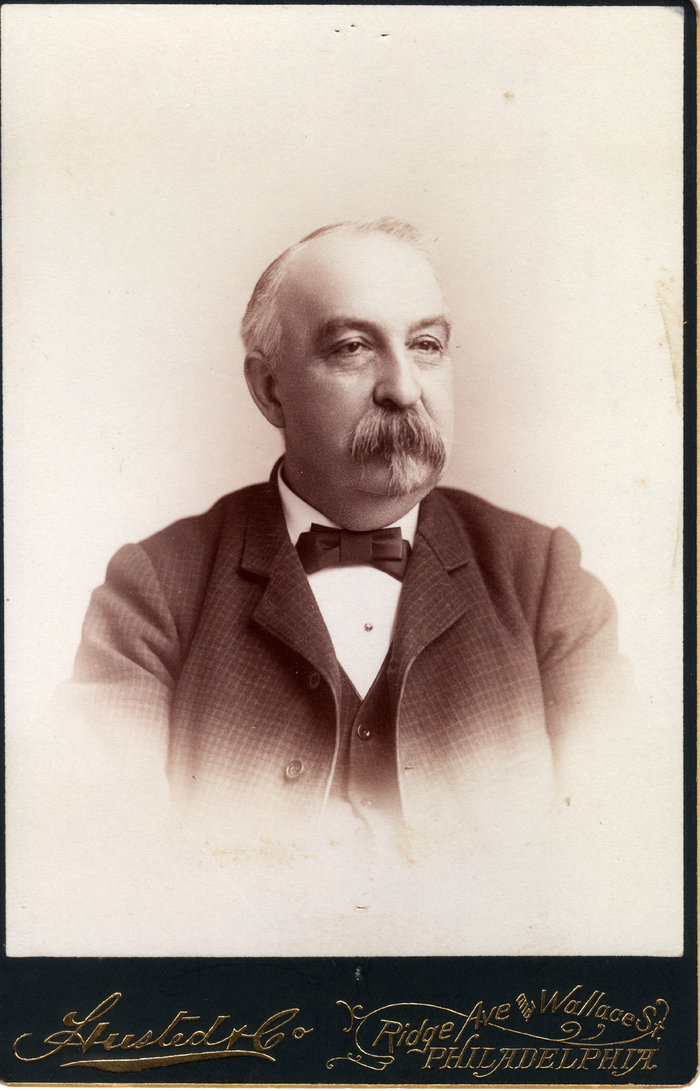
- Hexamer, February 1889
- Born: May 29, 1827; Koblenz
- Died: December 3, 1912 (aged 85); Philadelphia, Pennsylvania
- Spouse: Mary Klingel (1835–1923) (m. 1859)

Ernst Emil Julius Ferdinand Hexamer (29 May 1827 – 3 December 1912) was a German-born American civil engineer. He was known as originator of a system of fire insurance maps, which by the time of his death were used by fire insurance companies in all parts of the world.

== Life and work ==
Hexamer was born in Koblenz in 1827, were his father was High Court attorney. After his father's death the family moved to Heidelberg, where he attended the technical high school. Subsequently, he studied engineering at the Karlsruhe Institute of Technology under Ferdinand Redtenbacher.

During the Revolutions of 1848 Hexamer and his brothers joined the Student Movement for Freedom. After the collapse of the movement that year he and his brothers fled their homeland, and traveling from Switzerland to the United States. His elder brother Adolph C. Hexamer became a physician in New York, who published the book Die kinder-cholera oder summer complaint in den Vereinigten Staaten in 1858. His youngest brother was F.M. Hexamer wrote several books on agriculture and horticulture.

Hexamer started in America as artistic illustrator and designed grave monuments. Next he was employed by William Perris Civil Engineer and Surveyor, who in those days published a city plan for New York. He had started as surveyor and was promoted to technical head of projects soon after.

In 1856 Hexamer moved to Philadelphia, where he started his own civil engineer and surveyor company. Among other innovations, he developed a special type of plans for insurance businesses which were introduced throughout the world. In 1866 he started publishing The Hexamer General Surveys, a series of publications of illustrations of industrial and commercial buildings and properties from the greater Philadelphia area until 1896.

Hexamer was married to Mary Klingel (1835–1923) in 1859. one of the sons was Charles John Hexamer, PhD (1862–1921). He was founding president of the National German-American Alliance, where he served until 1917.

== Publications, a selection ==
- Hexamer, Ernest (1873-10-30). "Map Collection, Free Library of Philadelphia". Hexamer General Surveys, Volume 8; Plate(s): 738-739-740. E. Hexamer & Son.
- Hexamer, Ernest (1886-10-26). "Map Collection, Free Library of Philadelphia". Hexamer General Surveys, Volume 21; Plate(s): 2041-2042. E. Hexamer & Son.
- Hexamer, Ernest (1886-10-26). "Map Collection, Free Library of Philadelphia". Hexamer General Surveys, Volume 21; Plate(s): 2043. E. Hexamer & Son.
- Hexamer, Ernest (1893-08-26). "Map Collection, Free Library of Philadelphia". Hexamer General Surveys, Volume 28; Plate(s): 2693-2694. E. Hexamer & Son.
- Hexamer, Ernest (1893-08-26). "Map Collection, Free Library of Philadelphia". Hexamer General Surveys, Volume 28; Plate(s): 2695. E. Hexamer & Son.
