= German Society of the City of New York =

The German Society of the City of New York was established in 1784 to assist German immigrants in the United States.

== History ==
The German Society of the City of New York was founded on October 4, 1784, based on the model of the German Society of Pennsylvania in Philadelphia.

Founding members included John Christoph Kunze and Friedrich Wilhelm von Steuben. The association initially supported the German-American churches in New York.

With the introduction of large immigration waves from the 1830s, the German Society dealt with the smooth running of immigration. This included the fact that in Germany, too, the nature and the dangers of emigration were clarified. In addition, the German Society informed the German-Americans in New York about important bureaucratic features of the New World.

From 1837 to 1841, John Jacob Astor was the president of the company and donated $5,000 annually. In his testament he left another $20,000.

== See also ==
- History of Germans in the United States
- History of immigration to the United States
