= Oakes Hill =

Mountain in New York, United States

- Location within New York Location within the United States

Highest point
- Elevation: 1,690 feet (520 m)
- Coordinates: 43°21′28″N 75°17′38″W

Geography
- Location: N of Steuben, New York, U.S.
- Topo map: USGS North Western

Oakes Hill is a summit located in Central New York Region of New York located in the Town of Steuben in Oneida County, north of Steuben.
