= Steuben, New York =

Town in Oneida County, New York, US

- Town
- Location in Oneida County and New York.
- Coordinates: 43°20′16″N 75°14′57″W
- Country: United States
- State: New York
- County: Oneida
- Founded: 1792

Government
  - Type: Town council
  - Town council: Members' list: • Troy Finn (R); • Bruce Holck (R); • Janet Broadbent (D); • Ben Simons (R)

Area
  - Total: 42.70 sq mi (110.59 km^{2})
  - Land: 42.65 sq mi (110.47 km^{2})
  - Water: 0.046 sq mi (0.12 km^{2})
- Elevation: 1,519 ft (463 m)

Population (2010)
  - Total: 1,100
  - Estimate (2016): 1,125
  - Density: 26.4/sq mi (10.18/km^{2})
- Time zone: UTC-5 (Eastern (EST))
  - Summer (DST): UTC-4 (EDT)
- ZIP Codes: 13354 (Holland Patent); 13438 (Remsen); 13486 (Westernville)
- Area code: 315
- FIPS code: 36-71212
- GNIS feature ID: 0979525
- Website: Town website

Steuben (/ˈstjuːbən/ STEW-bən or /stjuːˈbɛn/ stew-BEN) is a town in Oneida County, New York, United States. The population was 1,110 at the 2010 census. The town is named after Baron von Steuben, a Prussian general who fought on the American side in the American Revolutionary War.

The Town of Steuben is approximately 18 miles (29 kilometers) northwest of Utica.

== History ==
The town is part of the land grant made to Friedrich Wilhelm von Steuben after the American Revolution. He maintained his summer residence in a log cabin in the town. His remains are buried in a state historic site east of Steuben village.

Steuben was formed from part of the Town of Whitestown in 1792. In 1796, part of Steuben was used to form the newer Town of Floyd and Town of Rome. Steuben was reduced again in 1797 to form the Town of Western.

== Geography ==
According to the United States Census Bureau, the town has a total area of 42.7 square miles (111 km^{2}), all land.

== Demographics ==
Historical population
Census	Pop.	Note	%±
1800	552		—
1810	1,105		100.2%
1820	1,461		32.2%
1830	2,091		43.1%
1840	1,993		−4.7%
1850	1,754		−12.0%
1860	1,554		−11.4%
1870	1,264		−18.7%
1880	1,223		−3.2%
1890	1,005		−17.8%
1900	902		−10.2%
1910	785		−13.0%
1920	786		0.1%
1930	690		−12.2%
1940	581		−15.8%
1950	540		−7.1%
1960	586		8.5%
1970	735		25.4%
1980	897		22.0%
1990	1,006		12.2%
2000	1,172		16.5%
2010	1,100		−6.1%
2016 (est.)	1,125		2.3%
U.S. Decennial Census

As of the census of 2000, there were 1,172 people, 429 households, and 332 families residing in the town. The population density was 27.4 inhabitants per square mile (10.6/km^{2}). There were 460 housing units at an average density of 10.8 per square mile (4.2/km^{2}). The racial makeup of the town was 98.55% White, 0.51% African American, 0.34% Native American, 0.17% Asian, 0.09% Pacific Islander, and 0.34% from two or more races. Hispanic or Latino of any race were 0.43% of the population.

There were 429 households, out of which 36.4% had children under the age of 18 living with them, 63.2% were married couples living together, 9.6% had a female householder with no husband present, and 22.6% were non-families. 16.6% of all households were made up of individuals, and 4.9% had someone living alone who was 65 years of age or older. The average household size was 2.70 and the average family size was 3.06.

In the town, the population was spread out, with 27.3% under the age of 18, 6.1% from 18 to 24, 30.3% from 25 to 44, 26.3% from 45 to 64, and 10.0% who were 65 years of age or older. The median age was 38 years. For every 100 females, there were 93.1 males. For every 100 females age 18 and over, there were 97.7 males.

The median income for a household in the town was $41,136, and the median income for a family was $44,583. Males had a median income of $29,625 versus $21,635 for females. The per capita income for the town was $17,385. About 8.4% of families and 9.9% of the population were below the poverty line, including 8.7% of those under age 18 and 14.0% of those age 65 or over.

== Communities and locations ==
- Boody Hill – An elevation located northwest of Steuben.
- Bowen Hill – An elevation located north of Fink Hollow.
- East Steuben – A hamlet in the northeastern part of the town.
- Fink Hollow – A hamlet north of Steuben.
- Maple Mountain – An elevation located northwest of Steuben.
- Merrick Corner – A hamlet south of Steuben.
- Oakes Hill – An elevation located northwest of Steuben.
- Penn Mountain – An elevation located west of East Stueben.
- Sixty Corners – A location northeast of Steuben, near the Steuben historic site.
- Steuben – The hamlet of Steuben, formerly "Steuben Corners" is on NY 274.
- Steuben Memorial State Historic Site – A historic site near the eastern town line.
- Steuben Valley – A hamlet at the southern town line and southeast of Steuben.
