= Maple Mountain (British Columbia) =

Mountain in British Columbia, Canada

- Location within British Columbia

Highest point
- Elevation: 506 m (1,660 ft)
- Prominence: 476 m (1,562 ft)
- Listing: Mountains of British Columbia
- Coordinates: 48°49′56″N 123°36′21″W

Geography
- Location: British Columbia, Canada
- District: Comiaken Land District
- Parent range: Vancouver Island Ranges
- Topo map: NTS 92B13 Duncan

Maple Mountain is a mountain on Vancouver Island in British Columbia, Canada. The mountain is located on the northern side of Maple Bay in North Cowichan, just NE of the city of Duncan.

There is a marked hiking trail that goes up Maple Mountain and affords views of the water, Salt Spring Island and the distant snowy peaks of the mainland. To get to the trailhead, follow Osborne Bay Road north toward Crofton and turn right on Chilco Road. Follow Chilco to the very end and park there. Walk past the yellow gate. Blue flagging tape marks the trail, which is well maintained.
