= Maple Mountain (Oneida County, New York) =

Mountain in New York, United States

- Location within New York Location within the United States

Highest point
- Elevation: 1,631 feet (497 m)
- Coordinates: 43°21′04″N 75°18′19″W

Geography
- Location: NW of Steuben, New York, U.S.
- Topo map: USGS North Western

Maple Mountain is a summit located in Central New York Region of New York located in the Town of Steuben in Oneida County, northwest of Steuben.
