= Regulations for the Order and Discipline of the Troops of the United States =

Drill manual

- Language: English

Publication details
- History: 1779
- Publisher: Friedrich Wilhelm von Steuben (United States)
- Frequency: Single Issue
- ISO 4: Find out here

Links
- Journal homepage

Regulations for the Order and Discipline of the Troops of the United States was a drill manual written by Inspector General Friedrich Wilhelm von Steuben during the American Revolutionary War. Commissioned to train troops at Valley Forge, Steuben first formed a model drill company of 100 men who were in turn to train further companies until the entire army was trained under the same procedures as the first company of troops. Following this exercise, Steuben published his drill instructions in a manual that was published in 1779 and widely distributed throughout the Continental Army. This manual became commonly known as the army's "Blue Book". It remained the official U.S. military guide until 1812.
