= Peter Stephen Du Ponceau =

French-born American linguist, philosopher and jurist (1760–1844)

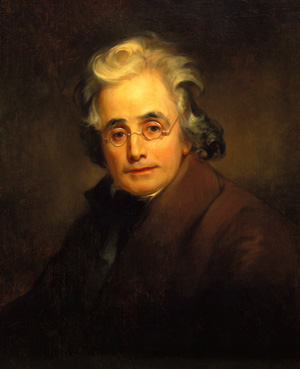
- Du Ponceau, circa 1830
- Born: Pierre-Étienne du Ponceau; 3 June 1760; Saint-Martin-de-Ré, France
- Died: 1 April 1844 (aged 83); Philadelphia, Pennsylvania, U.S.
- Resting place: Mount Vernon Cemetery
- Occupations: Philosopher, linguist, jurist

Peter Stephen Du Ponceau (born Pierre-Étienne du Ponceau; 3 June 1760 – 1 April 1844) was a French-born American linguist, philosopher and jurist. After emigrating to the Thirteen Colonies in 1777, he served in the American Revolutionary War. Afterward, he settled in Philadelphia, where he lived the remainder of his years. He contributed significantly to work on the indigenous languages of the Americas, as well as advancing the understanding of written Chinese.

== Family ==
Du Ponceau was born in a French Catholic military family. As a child, he lived with his grandmother, aunt, mother, father, younger brother Jean-Michel Du Ponceau and older sister Louise-Geneviéve Du Ponceau. Both his parents died when he was relatively young: his father died in 1774, and his mother died in 1780. Du Ponceau wrote to his sister for 65 years after his departure to America, and his brother attempted to write to him later on, though it is unknown if he was able to reach him.

== Early life ==
Du Ponceau's fondness for languages began at a very young age. At the age of 5, Du Ponceau knew both French and Latin by heart. While learning to write, he held extreme fascination with the letters "K" and "W". He studied at a Benedictine college until he abruptly ended his education after hearing news of severe prosecution of students like him. When he was 17, he emigrated to America in 1777 with Baron von Steuben, who was 30 years older. It was speculated at the time that they had been lovers.

== War service ==
Du Ponceau served as a secretary, translator, and interpreter to the Baron von Steuben in the Continental Army during the American Revolution. In 1781, he was forced to return home due to health issues and sudden illness, at the time believed to be consumption. After the war, he settled in Philadelphia, where he spent the rest of his life. Among his acquaintances were many important figures of the American Revolution, including Alexander Hamilton, John Laurens, Lafayette and James Monroe.

== Work in philosophy and linguistics ==
Du Ponceau joined the American Philosophical Society in 1791 and served as its vice president from 1816 until he became president in 1828, a position he held until his death. He became notable in linguistics for his analysis of the indigenous languages of the Americas. As a member of the society's Historical and Literary Committee, he helped build a collection of texts that described and recorded native languages. His book on their grammatical systems (Mémoire sur le système grammatical des langues de quelques nations indiennes de l'Amérique du Nord) won the Volney Prize of the Institute of France in 1835.

In 1816, he was elected a member of the American Antiquarian Society, and in 1820, he was elected a Fellow of the American Academy of Arts and Sciences.

Du Ponceau also worked on Asian languages and was one of the first Western linguists to reject the axiomatic classification of Chinese writing as ideographic. Du Ponceau stated:

1. That the Chinese system of writing is not, as has been supposed, ideographic; that its characters do not represent ideas, but words, and therefore I have called it lexigraphic.
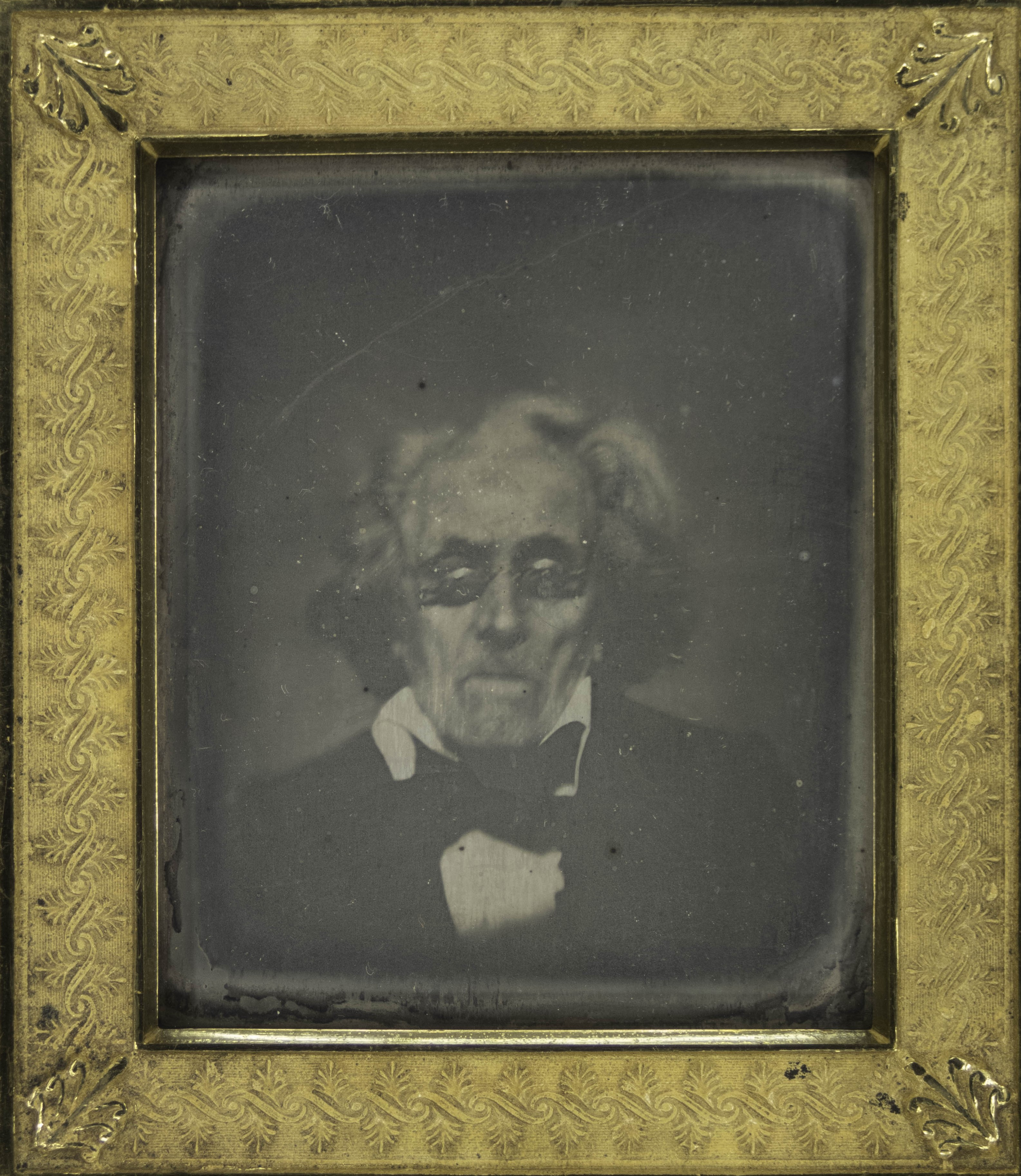
2. Du Ponceau in a daguerreotype by Robert Cornelius, March 1840 (or earlier)
  That ideographic writing is a creature of the imagination, and cannot exist, but for very limited purposes, which do not entitle it to the name of writing.
3. That among men endowed with the gift of speech, all writing must be a direct representation of the spoken language, and cannot present ideas to the mind abstracted from it.
4. That all writing, as far as we know, represents language in some of its elements, which are words, syllables, and simple sounds. In the first case it is lexigraphic, in the second syllabic, and in the third alphabetical or elementary.

He used the example of Vietnamese, then called "Cochinchinese," which used Chữ Nôm, a modified form of Chinese characters. He showed that Vietnamese used the Chinese characters to represent sound, not meaning. A hundred years later, his theory was still a source of controversy.

== Death ==
He died on 1 April 1844, in Philadelphia, Pennsylvania.

== Sources ==
- American Philosophical Society (n.d.). "Peter Stephen Du Ponceau Collection 1781–1844 Mss.B.D92p" (PDF online publication, updated version of Stephen Catlett's A New Guide to the Collections in the American Philosophical Society [Philadelphia, 1986]). MOLE: The Manuscripts Online Guide. Philadelphia: American Philosophical Society.
- D. H. Ramsey Library Special Collections (2003). "Pierre-Etienne Du Ponceau (1760–1844)". Speculation Lands Collection. D. H. Ramsey Library, University of North Carolina at Asheville.
- DeFrancis, John (1984). "The Ideographic Myth" (unpaginated online reproduction of chapter at Pinyin.info). The Chinese Language: Fact and Fantasy (1st pbk ed.). Honolulu: University of Hawaiʻi Press. pp. 133–148. ISBN 0-8248-1068-6. OCLC 10800032.
- Du Ponceau, Peter Stephen (1999) [1826]. "Essai de solution du problème philologique proposé en l'année 1823 par la Commission de l'Institut Royal de France, chargée de la disposition du legs de M. Le Comte de Volney". In Joan Leopold (series ed.) (ed.). The Prix Volney, volume II: Early nineteenth-century contributions to general and Amerindian linguistics: Du Ponceau and Rafinesque. The Prix Volney series, vol. 2 (in French). chapter ed. and notes to Du Ponceau's "Essai de solution" by Robert H. Robins. Dordrecht, Netherlands: Kluwer Academic. pp. 37–99. ISBN 0-7923-2506-0. OCLC 313609822.
- Du Ponceau, Peter Stephen (1838). A Dissertation on the Nature and Character of the Chinese System of Writing, in a Letter to John Vaughn, Esq. Philadelphia: The American Philosophical Society, by M'Carty and Davis. OCLC 3908044.
- Mooney, James (1909). "Peter Stephen Duponceau". In Charles G. Herbermann; Edward A. Pace; Condé B. Pallen; Thomas J. Shahan; John J. Wynne (eds.). The Catholic Encyclopedia: An International Work of Reference on the Constitution, Doctrine, Discipline, and History of the Catholic Church. Vol. V (New Advent online reproduction ed.). New York: Robert Appleton Company. OCLC 1017058.
- Robins, Robert H. (1999). "Du Ponceau and General and Amerindian Linguistics". In Joan Leopold (series ed.) (ed.). The Prix Volney, volume II: Early nineteenth-century contributions to general and Amerindian linguistics: Du Ponceau and Rafinesque. The Prix Volney series, vol. 2. Dordrecht, Netherlands: Kluwer Academic. pp. 1–36. ISBN 0-7923-2506-0. OCLC 313609822.
- Wilcox, David R.; Don D. Fowler (Spring 2002). "The beginnings of anthropological archaeology in the North American Southwest: from Thomas Jefferson to the Pecos Conference" (unpaginated online reproduction by Gale/Cengage Learning). Journal of the Southwest. 44 (2). Tucson: University of Arizona Press, on behalf of The Southwest Center, U. of Arizona: 121–234. ISSN 0894-8410. OCLC 79456398.
