= Albert Jaegers =

American sculptor (1868–1925)

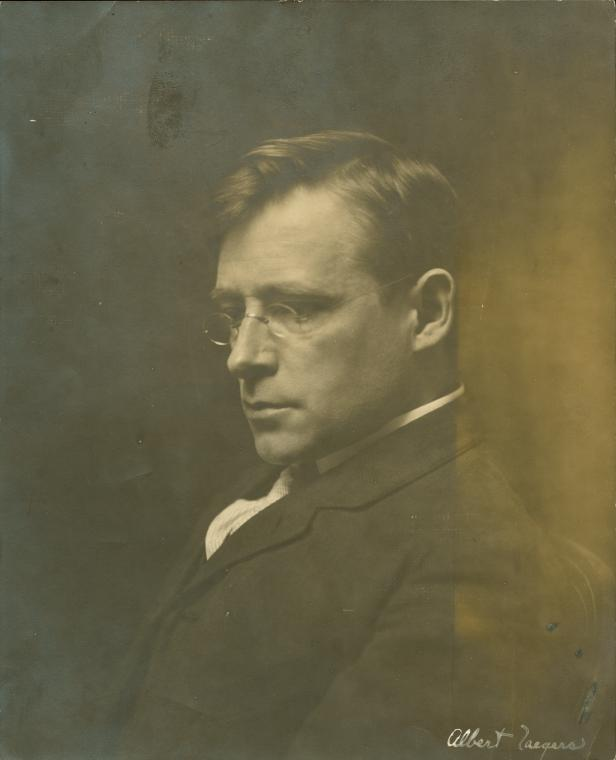
- Albert Jaegers
- Born: March 28, 1868; Elberfeld, Germany
- Died: July 22, 1925 (aged 57)
- Known for: sculpture

Albert Jaegers (March 28, 1868 – July 22, 1925) was an American sculptor.

== Life ==
Jaegers was born on March 28, 1868, in Elberfeld, Germany. He moved with his family to Cincinnati, Ohio, as a boy. He apprenticed to his father as a wood carver, then studied at the Cincinnati Art Academy, and later in London, Paris, and Rome.

In 1890, he married Matilda Holdt and launched his career as a sculptor. He won competitions sponsored by the National Sculpture Society.

He exhibited at the Pan-American Exposition (1901) and Louisiana Purchase Exposition (1904). For the latter he was commissioned to create the statue representing Arkansas.

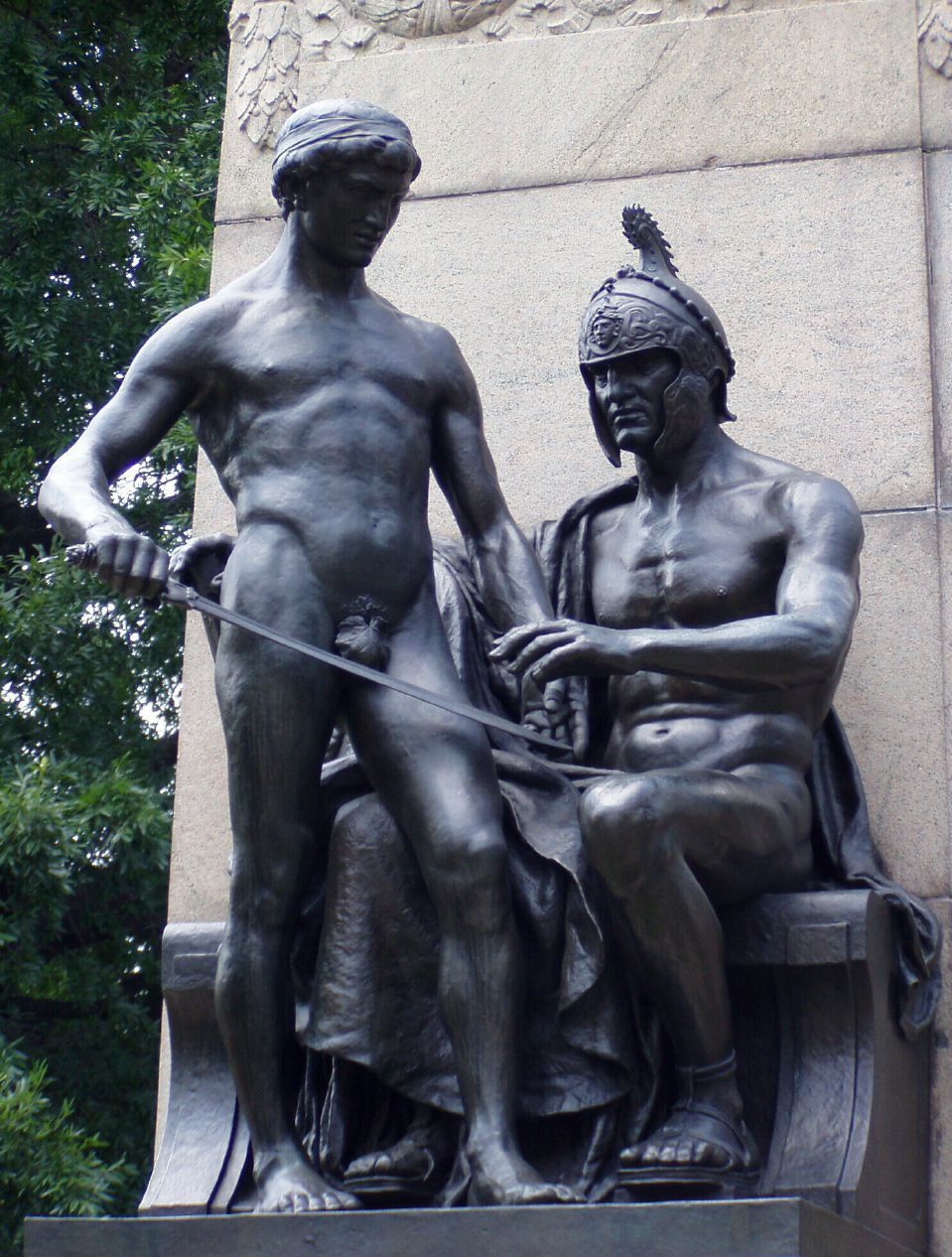
"Military Instruction": Detail of the Steuben Monument, Lafayette Park, in President's Park, Washington D.C.

In 1906 he won the commission for the Steuben Monument in Washington, D.C., on the basis of the endorsement of his work at an early stage of the competition by Augustus Saint-Gaudens. His bronze sculptures included an eleven-foot-high figure of the military leader set atop a granite pedestal almost 20 feet high. Alongside the pedestal are two groups. In the one called "Commemoration," a seated female figure, unclothed above the waist, represents America instructing a small child from a scroll he holds up to her as he kneels at her feet. In the other, "Military Instruction," a seated adult soldier, naked but for an elaborate helmet, "in the prime of life," holds an empty scabbard in one hand. With his other hand, as if providing instruction, he points to his unsheathed sword, held by the naked young man at his side.

When the U.S. government selected sculptors to create figures for the U.S. Custom House in New York City, each of which was to represent an historic seafaring power, Jaegers won the commission to create the one for Germany, which he planned as "an armed female figure, leaning on an antique shield, inscribed 'Kiel.'" Following the U.S. declaration of war on Germany in 1917, Secretary of the Treasury McAdoo asked him to modify it to represent Belgium, a U.S. ally in World War I. Jaegers refused to alter it, but the sculpture was modified over his objections. He said his work could not be seriously modified with "a little camouflage with a relabel" and called the change of name "a somewhat dubious honor for plucky little Belgium."

His sculptures of German-American historical figures were sometimes targeted when the U.S. and Germany were at war. The dedication of his figure of Monsignor Anthony Stein met with protest and threats of violence. The dedication of his statue of Francis Daniel Pastorius, the founder of Germantown, Pennsylvania, was delayed until after the end of World War I, and it was later removed from view during World War II.

In 1918 he contributed a small sculpture called "The Grenade Thrower" to a show of patriotic and war-related pieces.

Jaegers was a member of the National Sculpture Society and the National Institute of Arts and Letters. He was the brother of sculptor Augustine Jaegers (1878 – 1952), whose career paralleled his.

He lived on Washington Square Park in New York City.

He died from heart disease on July 22, 1925, in Suffern, New York.

== Select works ==
- 1900 – "To the memory of Hamilton Fish, Jr.", bas relief and inscribed tablet, bronze, Columbia University
- 1903 – Henry W. Maxwell Memorial, Grand Army Plaza, Brooklyn, New York (assisted Augustus Saint-Gaudens with this work)
- 1904 – "Egyptian Art", cornice – north entrance of St. Louis Art Museum, and other work for the Louisiana Purchase Exposition, St. Louis, Missouri
- 1907 – "Belgium" (originally entitled "Germany"), cornice figure, Alexander Hamilton U.S. Custom House, New York City
- 1910 – Major General Friedrich Wilhelm von Steuben Monument – Lafayette Park, President's Park, Washington D.C.
- 1913 – Joseph G. Cannon statue – Cannon House Office Building (part of Capitol complex), Washington D.C.
- 1915 – friezes at the Court of Seasons, Panama-Pacific International Exposition, San Francisco, California (razed)
- 1917 – Francis Daniel Pastorius Monument – Vernon Park, Philadelphia
- 1923 – Monsignor Anthony Stein statue – St. Joseph's School, Paterson, New Jersey
- 1925 – "German Pioneers" – Minnesota State Capitol, St. Paul, Minnesota
- 1925 – Henry Tureman Allen Memorial – Fort Myer, Arlington, VA
- Theodore Timby statue – Location unknown
- Friedrich von Steuben monument – Potsdam, Germany
- Friedrich von Steuben monument – Magdeburg, Germany
