= National German-American Alliance =

The National German-American Alliance (NGAA; German: Deutschamerikanischer National-Bund), was a federation of ethnic German associations in the United States founded in Philadelphia, Pennsylvania, on October 6, 1901. Charles John Hexamer was elected its first president, and served until 1917. The mission of the NGAA was to "promote and preserve German culture in America"; it essentially sought to resist the assimilation of Germans in America. At the peak of its growth, around 1916, the national organization had chapters in forty-five states, and the District of Columbia, and a membership of approximately 2.5 million people.

A professional movement, the NGAA promoted German language instruction in school, the foundation of educational societies, including the German American Historical Society, and the publication of histories and journals to demonstrate "the role German-Americans had played in the development of the United States."

== History ==
The formation of the NGAA was supported by existing state and local German-American organizations, as well as the German-American press. In particular, a state-level umbrella group of German-American organizations in Pennsylvania, the German-American Central Alliance of Pennsylvania (Deutsch-Amerikanischer Zentral-Bund von Pennsylvanien), founded in 1899, provided the impetus for the formation of a national organization. On June 19, 1900, the Pennsylvania group, under the leadership of its president, Charles J. Hexamer, hosted a meeting in Philadelphia of representatives from German-American organizations in Maryland, Minnesota, Ohio, and Pennsylvania. This core group, chaired by Hexamer, subsequently organized a larger meeting in Philadelphia the following year, on October 6, during the celebration of what was known as German Day, commemorating the arrival of the first German settlers in America. At that meeting, in 1901, the NGAA was officially founded by 39 delegates representing German-American organizations in 12 states and the District of Columbia.

The original delegates were primarily people of higher educational and social classes, and were from diverse professional backgrounds, including education, business, and the arts. In general the organization drew its initial support from intellectual elites, with no discernible presence of groups such as farmers, craftsmen, or factory workers.

The NGAA was given a United States congressional charter in 1907.

=== Cultural activities ===
In 1901 the NGAA took an important step toward furthering its cultural goals with the founding of the Philadelphia-based German American Historical Society, which together with the NGAA sponsored the journal Americana Germanica as its official organ. Edited by Marion Dexter Learned, a professor of German at the University of Pennsylvania, the journal was devoted to scholarship in German-American studies, including literary, linguistic, and cultural matters, and also published American-written articles in the general field of Germanics; it became known as German-American Annals beginning in 1903, and continued until 1919.

In 1909 the NGAA began to issue its own monthly bulletin, Mitteilungen.

=== Political issues, prohibition ===
Besides its primary activities focusing on the preservation of German culture in the United States, the NGAA had by 1903 also begun to venture into political issues affecting German Americans and German-American culture, while refraining from endorsing particular political candidates. Specifically, it sought to bolster support for the offering of German-language instruction in public schools; it opposed restriction on immigration (a position that formed a tenet in its constitution); and it opposed the prohibition movement. The issue of prohibition rose to the status of a top priority at the NGAA convention in Baltimore, in 1903. Although there was no connection at that time between the organization and brewing companies, it subsequently drew the attention and support of the brewing industry, including the United States Brewers' Association.

As American anti-German hysteria boiled over upon American entry into the war in 1917, brewing activity received considerable attention with regard to the possibility of disloyalty to the American war cause. The Anti-Saloon League and other dry organizations recognized the unique opportunity presented to them by the anti-German sentiment, and mobilized to attack the vulnerable position of native German brewers in American society. With increased frequency the Anti-Saloon League played on public opinion to question the loyalties of German brewers, shrewdly linking breweries to a list of institutions whose right to exist had been called into question in the midst of the growing anti-German hysteria.

During the first decade of the twentieth century the Cincinnati German-American community began a campaign to counter the rapid rise in prohibition sentiment. The organization held events such as in Cincinnati on July 21, 1907, when the German-American Alliance held a public gathering at Coney Island dubbed "Puritanism against Liberalism." In the view of local Germans, the issue was a simple matter of freedom, one of particular importance to immigrants who had left behind an oppressive homeland.

Cincinnati brewers and German-American societies combined to demonstrate the extent to which Prohibition would harm the industry as well as the national economy. An October 1910 publication of the Deutsche Schutzen-Gesellschaft of Covington noted that the government received approximately $80,000,000 in taxes from beer sales the year before. The clear implication was that the termination of such vital activity, involving over 1,500 breweries and 50,000 employees in the case of national prohibition, would have dire consequences for all involved.

=== Demise ===
In an atmosphere of rising anti-German sentiment, the NGAA's outspokenness against prohibition, its stance for neutrality during World War I, and its support of Germany, especially its practice of raising money for German war relief, led to its charter being revoked in 1918, following a Senate investigation. Congress passed a bill to revoke the charter in July, and President Wilson signed the measure into law on August 31. Under political pressure from all sides, the NGAA had already folded in April 1918.

=== Successor ===
A later organization known as the German American Citizens League of the United States (Deutschamerikanischer Bürgerbund der Vereinigten Staaten) considered itself a successor to the NGAA, and shared many of the same goals. Like the NGAA, the League promoted the German language, literature, traditions, music and character, and sought to "provide for the adequate representation of the German-American element in the public life of the United States." In 1923, it "aimed to prevent another war between this country and Germany." The League was open only to US citizens who obligated themselves to vote if physically possible. It was headquartered in Chicago, where it published the weekly Deutschamerikanische Bürgerzeitung. It also published the Staatsbürger in St. Louis.

== Publications ==
- (1908) Effect of prohibition: An argument on the errors of prohibition. Missouri and Southern Illinois Division.
- (1912) The German element in the United States. New England Branch.
- (1912) Grundsätze und Verfassung des Deutschamerikanischen Nationalbundes der Vereinigten Staaten von Amerika. Deutschamerikanischer Nationalbund.

== See also ==
- German-Americans
- German language in the United States
- Nativism (politics) in the United States

== Bibliography ==
- Child, Clifton James. The German-Americans in Politics, 1914-17 (1939) focus on the Alliance.
- Detjen, David W. The Germans in Missouri, 1900-1918: Prohibition, Neutrality, and Assimilation (University of Missouri Press, 1985).
- Johnson, C.T. (1999). Culture at Twilight: The National German-American Alliance, 1901-1918. Peter Lang.
