= Charles John Hexamer =

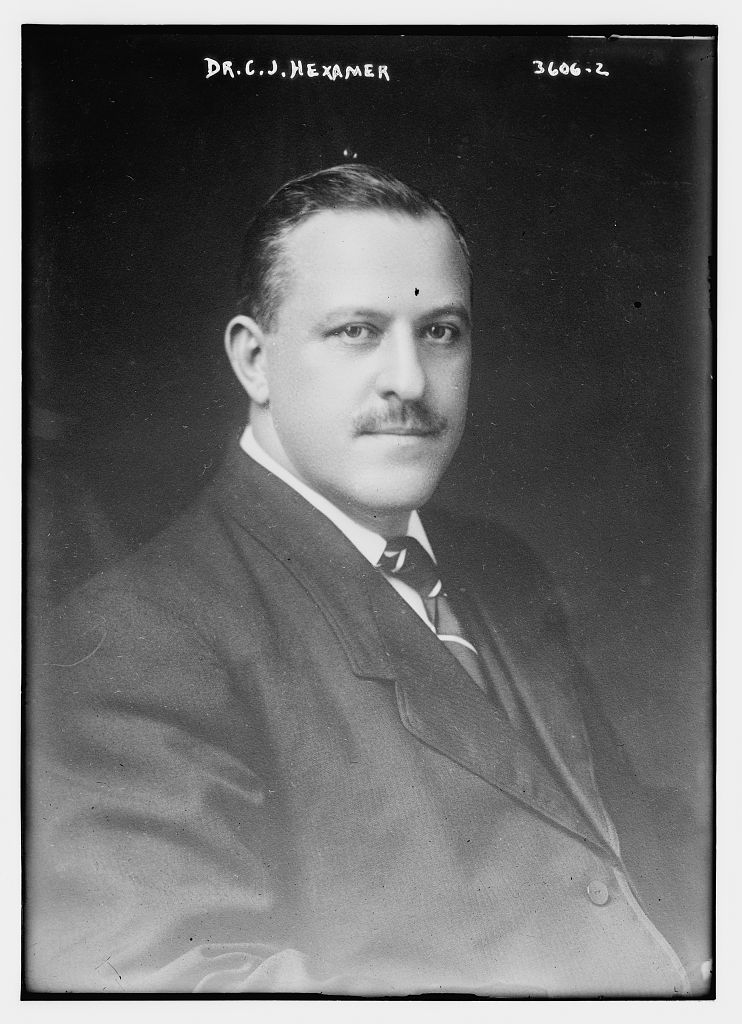
- Hexamer circa 1915

President of the National German-American Alliance
- In office 1901–1917

Personal details
- Born: May 9, 1862 Philadelphia, Pennsylvania
- Died: October 15, 1921 (aged 59) Philadelphia, Pennsylvania
- Spouse: Annie Josephine Haeuptner (m. 1890–1921)

Charles John Hexamer, Ph.D. (May 9, 1862 – October 15, 1921) was the president of the National German-American Alliance from 1901 to 1917.

== Biography ==
He was born on May 9, 1862, in Philadelphia, Pennsylvania, to Mary and Ernst Emil Julius Ferdinand Hexamer. He married Annie Josephine Haeuptner in 1890 in Philadelphia.

In 1901 Hexamer co-founded the National German-American Alliance, where he was its first president until 1917. In 1904 he received from Wilhelm II, German Emperor the 4th order of the Red Eagle for his activity on behalf of German Kultur.

He died on October 15, 1921, in Philadelphia. He was buried in Grove Church Cemetery in North Bergen, New Jersey.
