= Seven Corners Shopping Center =

Virginia shopping center

Coordinates: 38°52′6″N 77°9′7.3″W

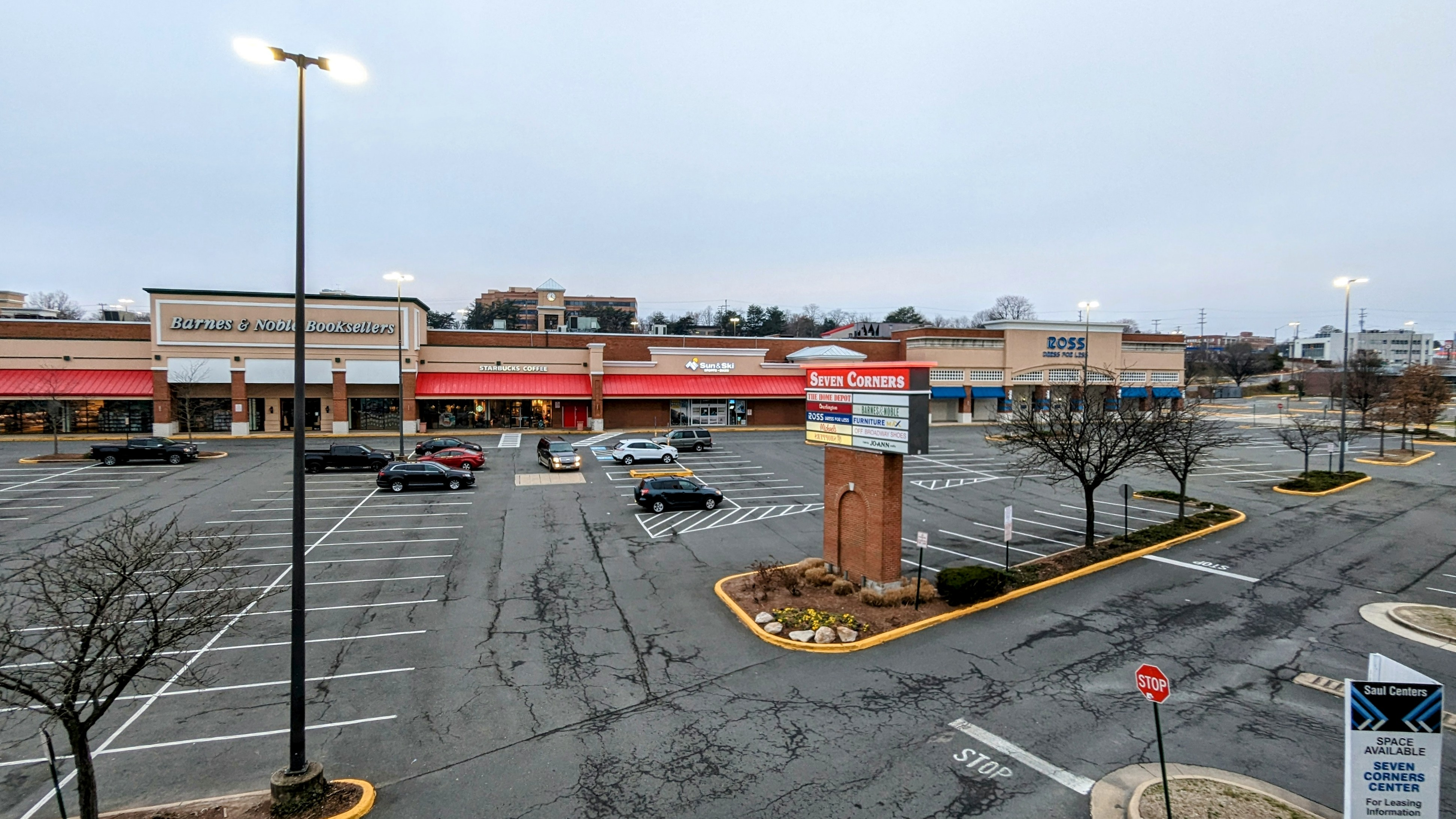
Seven Corners Shopping Center

Seven Corners Shopping Center was the first major shopping center to open in suburban Washington, D.C. It is located in Seven Corners, Fairfax County, Virginia. At its opening in 1956, it was the largest regional shopping center in Virginia. The backsplit two-story mall structure was revamped in the mid-1990s as a dual ground level power center. There are plans to replace the center with a thoroughly new development.

== History ==
The 45-store, $25 million, 600,000-square-foot (56,000 m^{2}) center, developed by Kass-Berger of Washington, D.C., formally opened October 4, 1956, on a 29-acre (120,000 m^{2}) parcel at the intersection of Arlington Boulevard (U.S. Route 50) and Leesburg Pike (State Route 7). At opening, the store was anchored by Washington D.C.–based department stores Julius Garfinckel & Co. and a 128,000-square-foot (11,900 m^{2}) Woodward & Lothrop. The center also included a Food Lane supermarket; Woolworth's; Bond Stores, Franklin Simon & Co., Joseph R. Harris Co., Peck & Peck, and Wilson's Mens Store clothing stores; Mayer & Company furniture; Thom McAn and Hahn's Shoes; Fanny Farmer candy; and Western Auto as well as a Peoples Drug Store, which featured stores on both the upper and lower concourses (connected via a staircase). It also included the first cafeteria in northern Virginia, an S&W Cafeteria. When opened, the center employed nearly 1,000. A Raleigh's joined the center sometime after its opening, as did a Varsity Shop men's clothing outlet and a Brentano's book store.

Seven Corners has always been a major bus stop and bus terminal. The stop was originally located outside the Garfinckel's on the lower level, then moved to the upper level next to the central escalators until the building was redesigned. Today, the bus stop sits near its original lower level location, at a transit station constructed by Fairfax County.

The main building was shaped like an "I" with two anchors at either end and two 19-foot (5.8 m) wide promenades connecting. The center was built on a hillside in a split level design with escalators connecting the two levels. Heating and cooling were by water from an underground lake located beneath the center.

The center prospered through the 1980s with stores like Diskovery (computers) and Waldenbooks (formerly Brentano's). With competition from a growing number of regional malls in the area, compounded by the bankruptcy of Garfinckel's in 1990, Raleigh's and Woodward & Lothrop closed in 1995. As the indoor mall lost relevance, Seven Corners fell victim to vacancy and disrepair. By 1997, most of the original enclosed mall had been removed or redeveloped, with Seven Corners converted into an outdoor shopping center and replaced with a big-box style power center. As a result, Seven Corners is no longer an enclosed single shopping center, but essentially two outdoor strip malls. Instead of using interior promenades, shoppers must walk along the parking lot to go from store to store. The two levels are no longer connected by escalators; there is only a narrow exterior metal and concrete stairway at one end of the complex, which is rarely used by shoppers. The Garfinckel's now occupied by a Ross Dress for Less is the only portion of the original Seven Corners Center still standing. Once reopened, the new two level complex anchor stores included Shoppers Food Warehouse, Home Depot, Best Buy, Service Merchandise, and Barnes & Noble. Around 2003, Best Buy moved out and was replaced by RoomStore which closed in late 2012. The Service Merchandise store was replaced by Syms, which also closed in late 2011. The Shoppers grocery store was closed and converted to Giant Food in mid-2019, as part of the eventual closing of all Shoppers stores.

The center was the site of one of the Washington, D.C. Beltway sniper attacks in 2002. It is currently managed by Saul Centers of Bethesda, Maryland.
