= Houndstooth =

Two-color broken check pattern

Houndstooth pattern

Houndstooth is a pattern of alternating light and dark checks used on fabric. It is also known as hounds tooth check, hound's tooth (and similar spellings), dogstooth, dogtooth or dog's tooth. The duotone pattern is characterized by a tessellation of light and dark solid checks alternating with light-and-dark diagonally-striped checks—similar in pattern to gingham plaid but with diagonally-striped squares in place of gingham's blended-tone squares. Traditionally, houndstooth uses black and white, although other contrasting colour combinations may be used.

== History ==
The oldest Bronze Age houndstooth textiles found so far are from the Hallstatt Celtic Salt Mine, Austria, 1500–1200 BC. One of the best known early occurrences of houndstooth is the Gerum Cloak, a garment uncovered in a Swedish peat bog, dated to between 360 and 100 BC. Contemporary houndstooth checks may have originated as a pattern in woven tweed cloth from the Scottish Lowlands, but are now used in many other woven fabrics aside from wool. The traditional houndstooth check is made with alternating bands of four dark and four light threads in both warp and weft/filling woven in a simple 2:2 twill, two over/two under the warp, advancing one thread each pass. In an early reference to houndstooth, De Pinna, a New York City–based men's and women's high-end clothier founded in 1885, included houndstooth checks along with gun-club checks, and Scotch plaids as part of its 1933 spring men's suits collection. The actual term houndstooth for the pattern is not recorded before 1936.

Oversized houndstooth patterns were also employed prominently at Alexander McQueen's Fall 2009 Collection, entitled Horn of Plenty. The patterns were a reference to Christian Dior's signature tweed suits.

Houndstooth patterns, especially black-and-white houndstooth, have long been associated regionally with the University of Alabama (UA). This is because the longtime UA football coach Bear Bryant often (though not exclusively) wore black-and-white houndstooth fedoras. The university has attempted to assert a trademark for houndstooth, especially when used in conjunction with other symbols of the school and its football team, a legal strategy that has been largely unsuccessful.

The Australian department store David Jones' branding—a black-on-white houndstooth pattern—is one of the most recognised corporate identities in Australia. A government-sponsored panel judged it in 2006 as one of Australia's top-10 favourite trademarks. The iconic design was the result of a 1967 rebranding exercise by chairman Charles Lloyd Jones, Jr., who wished that the store would be so well known by the design as to not require the use of the name on the packing. It was allegedly inspired by the houndstooth design on a Miss Dior perfume bottle belonging to his mother, Hannah Jones. On 25 July 2016, David Jones introduced a new logo, with a revised font style, and removed references to the houndstooth online.

== Variations ==
A smaller-scale version of the pattern can be referred to as puppytooth.

== Popular culture ==
Ricky, a main character in the Canadian comedy series Trailer Park Boys is frequently seen wearing a houndstooth button-up shirt. It has become an unofficial branding element for the series, with different merchandise featuring the pattern.

== Gallery ==
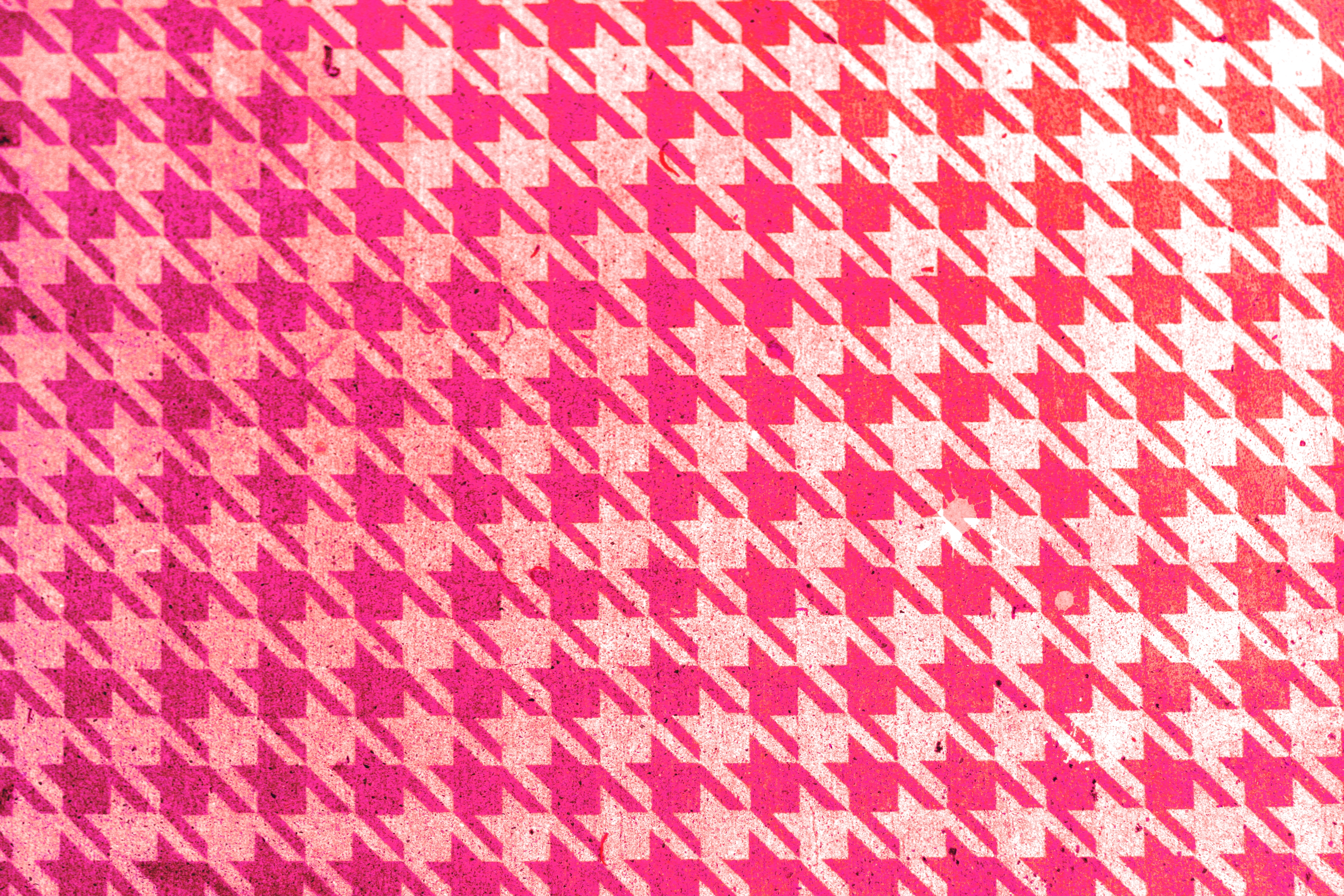
Red and white houndstooth pattern

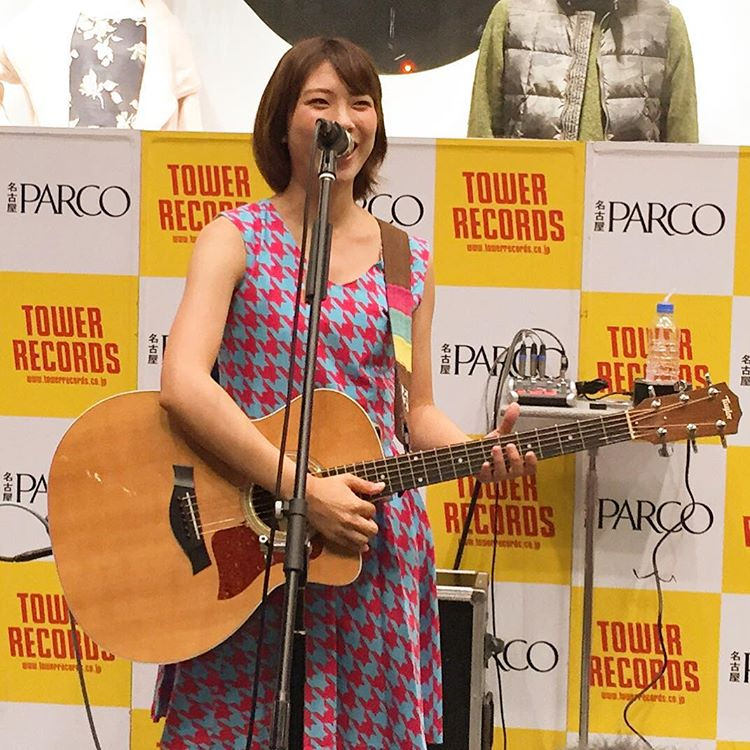
Aoi Yamazaki wearing a colored houndstooth dress

Weaving a small-scale houndstooth check in a 2:2 twill

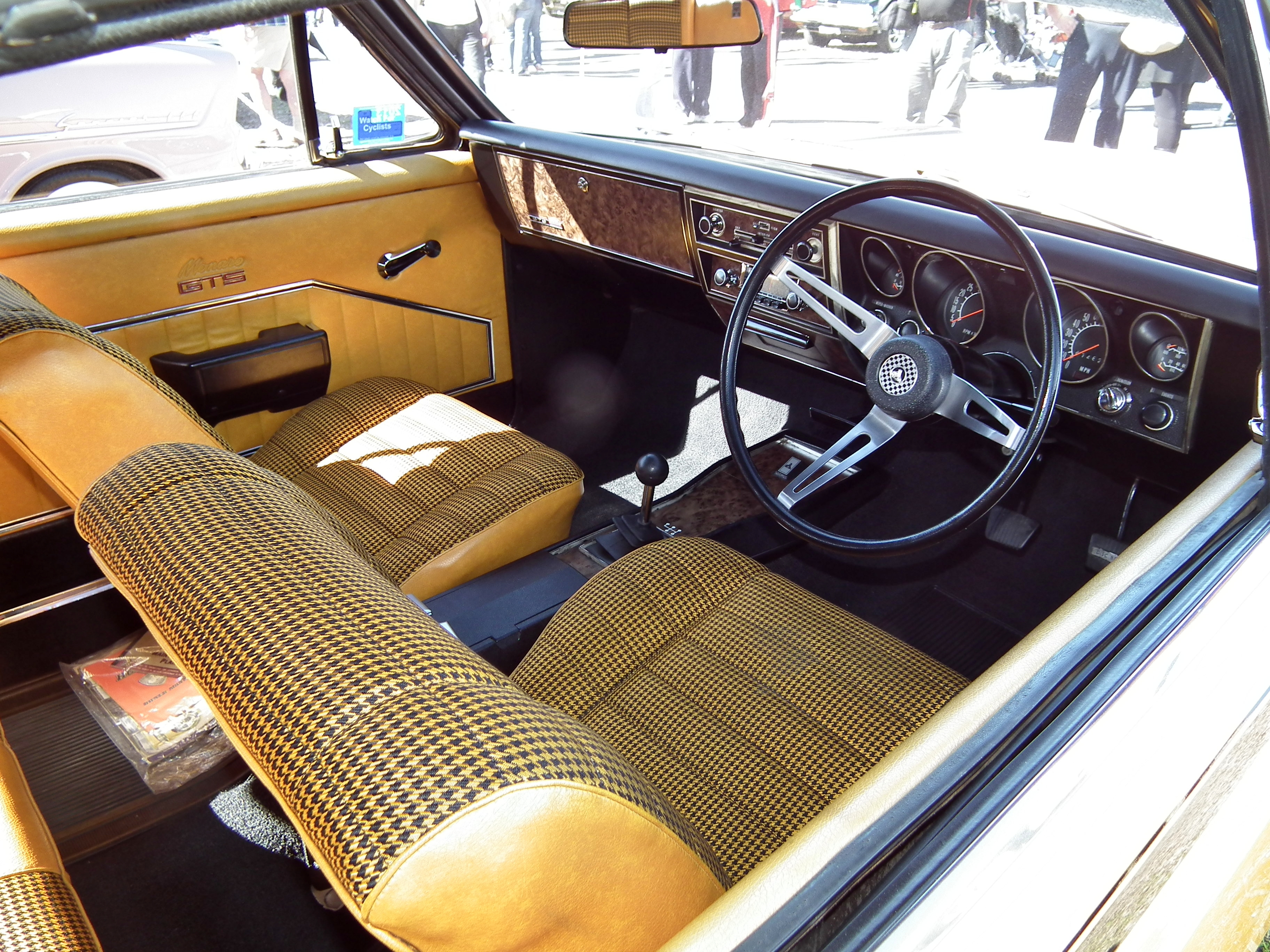
A car interior with Glen plaid pattern upholstery

A single element of the pattern

== See also ==
- Argyle
- Glen plaid
