= Bond Clothing Stores =

Men's clothing company

- Industry: Retail
- Founded: 1914
- Defunct: ca. 1989
- Fate: Liquidation
- Headquarters: New York and Nationwide
- Products: Men's apparel and accessiories

Bond Clothing Stores, Bond Clothes, Bond Clothiers, or Bond Stores, was a men's clothing manufacturing company and retailer. The company catered to the middle-class consumer.

== History ==
The company was founded in Cleveland, Ohio, in 1914, when Mortimer Slater, with Charles Anson Bond and Lester Cohen, founded the stores as a retail outlet for their suit manufacturing company. Bond, whose name was chosen for its market value and meaning, left Cleveland for Columbus, Ohio, where he opened a branch of the company. Bond stepped away from active management when he was elected mayor of Columbus in 1907. The first store sold men's suits for $15 ($400.00 today). As president, Slater built the concern into a million-dollar corporation, increasing the number of employees from 50 to more than 4,000. At his retirement in 1924, the concern had 28 stores in large cities. Bond sold his interest in the 1920s.

Bond Stores, Inc. was organized in Maryland on March 19, 1937, by the consolidation of Bond Clothing Company, a Maryland corporation, and its subsidiary, Bond Stores, Inc. The principal executive offices of the corporation were located at 261 Fifth Avenue in New York City.

During the 1930s and 1940s, it became the largest retail chain of men's clothing in the United States, best known for selling two-pant suits.

In 1975, the company was sold to foreign investors, then broken up and sold in smaller groups to its management. For instance, 13 stores were operated by the Proud Wind, Inc. company.

== Manufacturing operations ==
In 1933, company president Barney S. Ruben (1885–1959) moved the manufacturing center of Bond Clothes from New Brunswick, New Jersey, to Rochester, New York, where he spent his youth and got his start in the clothing industry with Fashion Park Clothes. By the end of the 1930s, the manufacturer grew to employ over 2,500 people, becoming the city's largest employer of textile workers. During the 1940s, the company expanded to larger manufacturing facilities on North Goodman Street, but by 1954, company leaders acknowledged that they could not fully employ the space, and sold it to General Dynamics. (Today, it is a Bausch and Lomb contact lens factory.) In 1956, wholly owned manufacturing plants operated at New Brunswick, New York City, and Rochester. The company closed its Rochester factory in 1979.

== Retail stores ==
Bond was principally a men's clothier, but by the mid-1950s some stores also carried women's clothing and later became known as "family apparel centers." In 1956, the chain operated nearly 100 outlets from coast to coast in principal cities and more than 50 agency stores that sold goods in smaller communities. In the late 1960s, it had about 150 retail outlets. Around 1970, new management knowledgeable in fashions took over Bond Clothes, but their knowledge of the retail clothing industry did nothing to save Bond Clothes from its eventual demise. By 1982, that number had dwindled to 50.

=== New York City ===
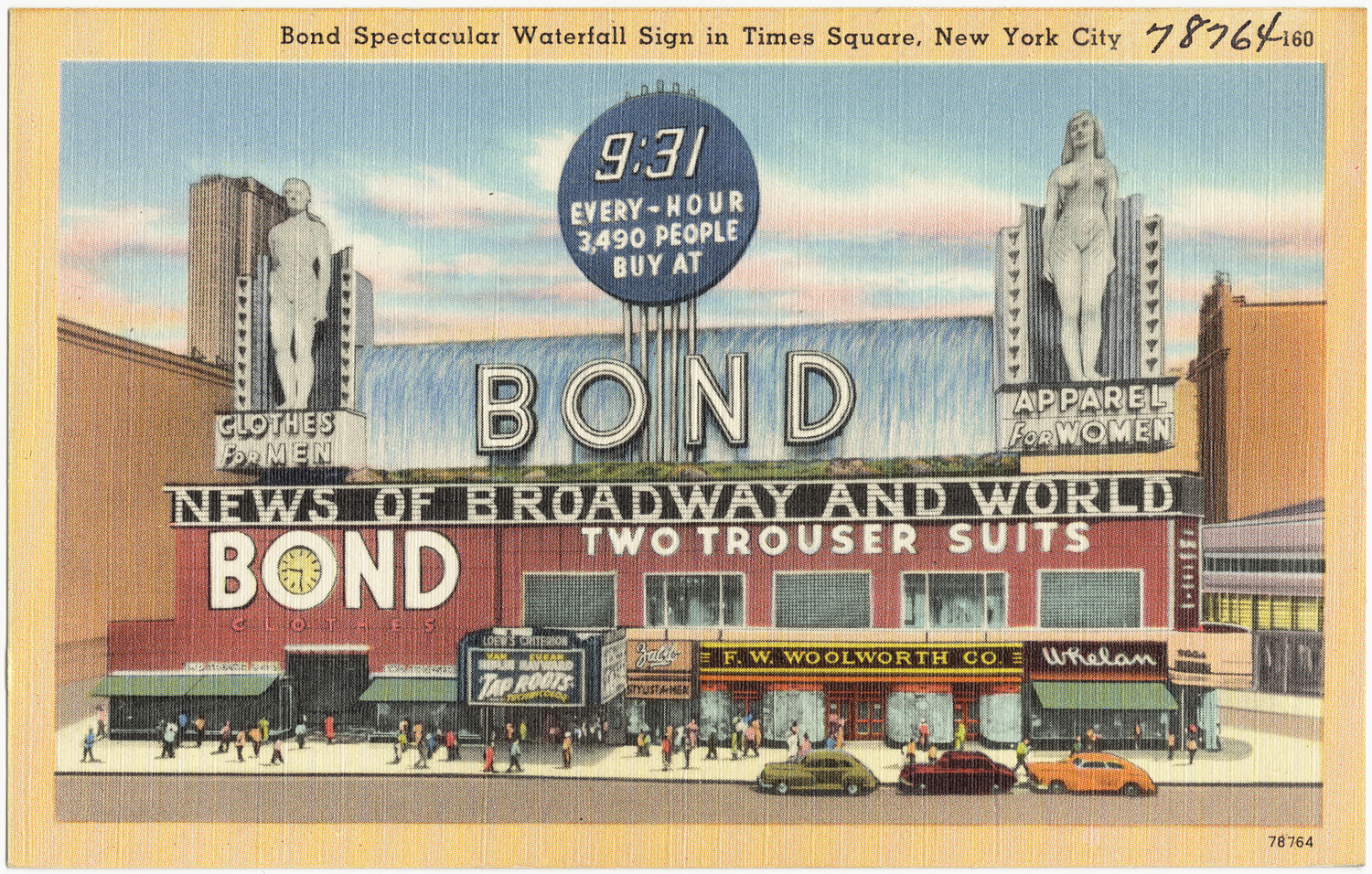
Postcard image of the Times Square sign in daytime

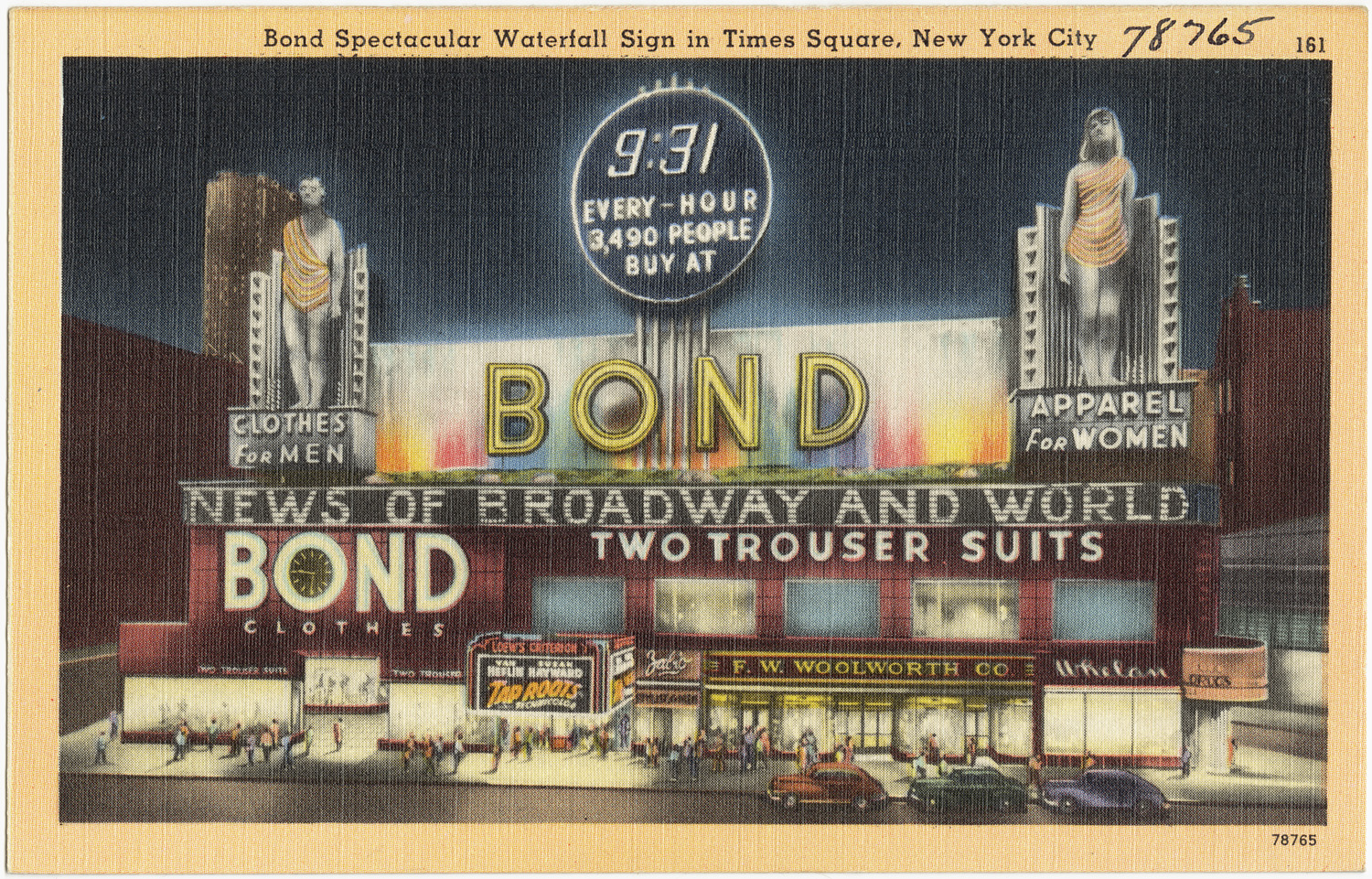
Postcard image of the sign at night

Its New York City flagship store, known as "Bond Fifth Avenue," was at 372 Fifth Avenue at 35th Street. The space was formerly the flagship of Best & Co., which leased the store and the adjoining 12-story office tower to Bond in 1947. The next year, Bond renovated the entire building with ultra-modern interiors under the direction of designer Morris Lapidus. Bond stayed in the building until the mid-1970s. The building has most recently been redeveloped by the Paratis Group as a commercial / residential complex known as the "372 Fifth Avenue Loft."

From 1940 to 1977, the company also operated a store at Times Square. Located on the east side of Broadway between 44th and 45th Streets, it was dubbed "the cathedral of clothing". In 1980, the building became a dance club, Bond International Casino, which hosted a concert by The Clash in 1981. The building housed a restaurant called Bond 45 until December 2015. Since 2017, the site has housed a GAP and Old Navy.

==== Times Square sign ====
From 1948 until 1954, a huge and elaborate display topped the Times Square store. Two miles of neon tubing were used for the display, which was built around a sign that spelled out "BOND". This was flanked by two 7-story nude figures, a man and a woman. Between them stood a waterfall, 27 feet (8.2 m) high and 132 feet (40 m) wide, filled with 50,000 gallons of recirculating water spiked with antifreeze to keep it moving in winter. Beneath the waterfall was a 278-foot-long (85 m) zipper sign with more than 20,000 bulbs to display scrolling messages. Above the waterfall was a digital clock with the wording "Every Hour 3,490 People Buy at Bond." Some of the sign remained in place to advertise the Bond Stores location until the store's closure in 1977.

=== Greater Los Angeles ===
Bond's built its nine-story Los Angeles flagship in 1939 at 640 South Broadway, in what was then the city's primary shopping district. By 1960, the chain had stores on Wilshire Boulevard's Miracle Mile, Crenshaw Center, and Hollywood Boulevard; in Anaheim Plaza, the El Monte Shopping Center, on Whittier Boulevard in East Los Angeles, Brand Boulevard in Glendale, in Huntington Park, Lakewood Center, Valley Plaza in North Hollywood, Panorama City Shopping Center, Eastland Shopping Center in West Covina, and Westchester. Its flagship building, now the Pavo Real Jewelry Center, retains its large Bond sign down its vertical length.

=== Washington, D.C., and vicinity ===
Bond Stores entered the Washington, D.C., market in 1925. Its local flagship store opened in the early 1930s at 1335 F Street NW in the heart of the downtown shopping district. It closed in January 1982.

Suburban locations in northern Virginia operated at Landmark Mall in Alexandria (opened 1966) and Seven Corners Shopping Center in Falls Church (opened October 1956, closed 1976). Outlets in suburban Maryland operated at Montgomery Mall in Bethesda, Prince George's Plaza in Hyattsville (opened 1959, closed ca. 1982), and Marlow Heights Shopping Center at Marlow Heights.

=== Cleveland, Ohio ===
Bond built one of its last standalone downtown stores in 1946 and 1947, replacing a 1920 building at Euclid Avenue and East Ninth Street in Cleveland. Designed in a high-concept art moderne style, the structure used the site's sharp angle by creating a tower crowned with windows facing inbound Euclid Avenue traffic. The circular forms of the tower were repeated in the roof's overhang. On the Euclid Avenue and East Ninth Street facades, open gill-like projections held vertical window columns facing east and south. The building was faced with rose granite sheets and the BOND name was illuminated in red neon. Inside, the round themes were repeated in ceiling moldings, mirrors, and plaster reliefs. It was razed in the 1970s.

=== Chicago, Illinois ===
240 S State Street, 1954.

=== Buffalo, New York ===
Bond Stores operated at least two locations in the Buffalo, New York area. In 1940, they took over the Givens, Inc. women's and children's apparel store at 452-54 Main Street in downtown Buffalo. A suburban location opened in 1962, at the new Boulevard Mall.

=== Dallas, Texas ===
Bond Stores were located at 1500 Main Street (Southwestern Life Insurance Building) and 1530 Main Street, now The Joule Hotel. In the 1960s and 1970s, a third store was in NorthPark Center at 8687 North Central Expressway (US 75).
