= Little Saigon (disambiguation) =

Little Saigon is a common name for an urban enclave with large numbers of Vietnamese people and/or businesses within a non-Vietnamese society.

- Little Saigon, Arlington, Virginia
- Little Saigon, Orange County, California
- Little Saigon, Houston, Texas
- Little Saigon, Philadelphia, Pennsylvania
- Little Saigon, San Jose, California
- Little Saigon, San Diego, California
- Little Saigon, Atlanta, Georgia
