= Gerum Cloak =

Archeological artifact found in Sweden

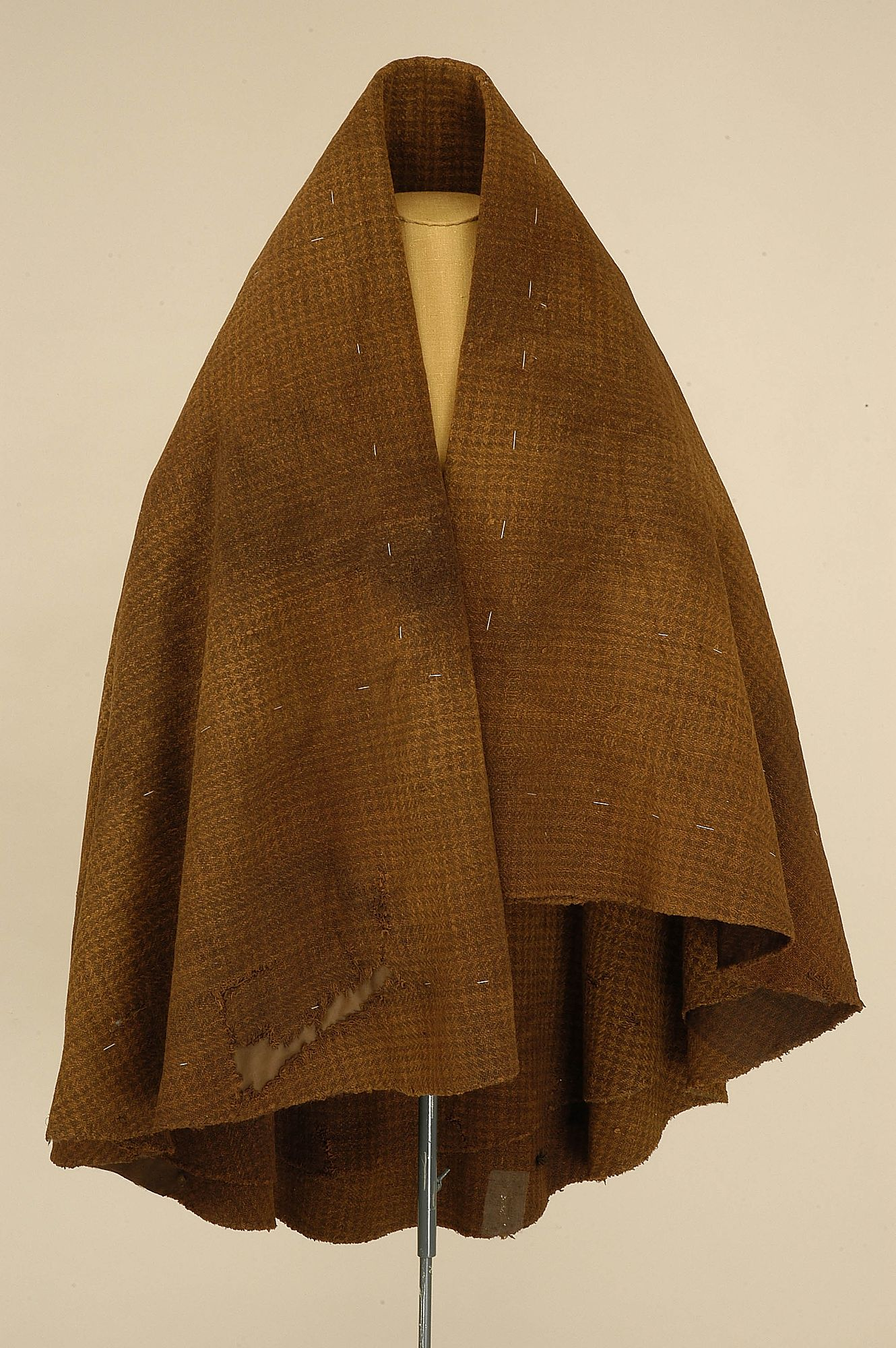
- Material: Wool
- Height: 2 meters
- Width: 2.48 meters
- Discovered: 1920; Skaraborg County, Sweden
- Discovered by: Johan Klasson
- Present location: Stockholm, Stockholm County, Sweden

The Gerum Cloak is a nearly intact brown wool cloak dating from 360 – 100 BC that was found in a peat bog on Gerumsberget plateau, Skaraborg County, Sweden in 1920. The cloak is notable not only for its age and how well it was preserved, but for the Houndstooth pattern in which it was woven.

== Description ==
The cloak is oval shaped and has a few small holes in it, mainly around the bottom edge. The biggest of these holes was made by Johan Fredrik Klasson with his shovel when he was digging in the bog and found the cloak.

The cloak was originally made of white and brown wool, but it all became brown after having been in the bog for so long. A replica is on display in Falbygden's Museum in Falköping, while the original is stored in the Historical Museum in Stockholm. The cloak has a breadth of 2.48 metres (8 ft 2 in) and a height of 2 metres (6 ft 7 in)

== Interpretations ==
When the cloak was found in the bog, it was folded with three stones lying on top of it. Given the holes in the cloak, it is believed that the wearer was stabbed, possibly to death. However, this gives rise to some uncertainty as the cloak was found folded and no human remains were found with it or nearby.

Through measuring the strontium isotope system of the wool and dye, it is believed that the wool came from sheep who grazed and lived in the area south west of Torpa stenhus. The wool was not from the local area around where the cloak was found on Gerumsberget, but at least 45 miles (72 km) southwest.
