= Julius Garfinckel =

American businessman

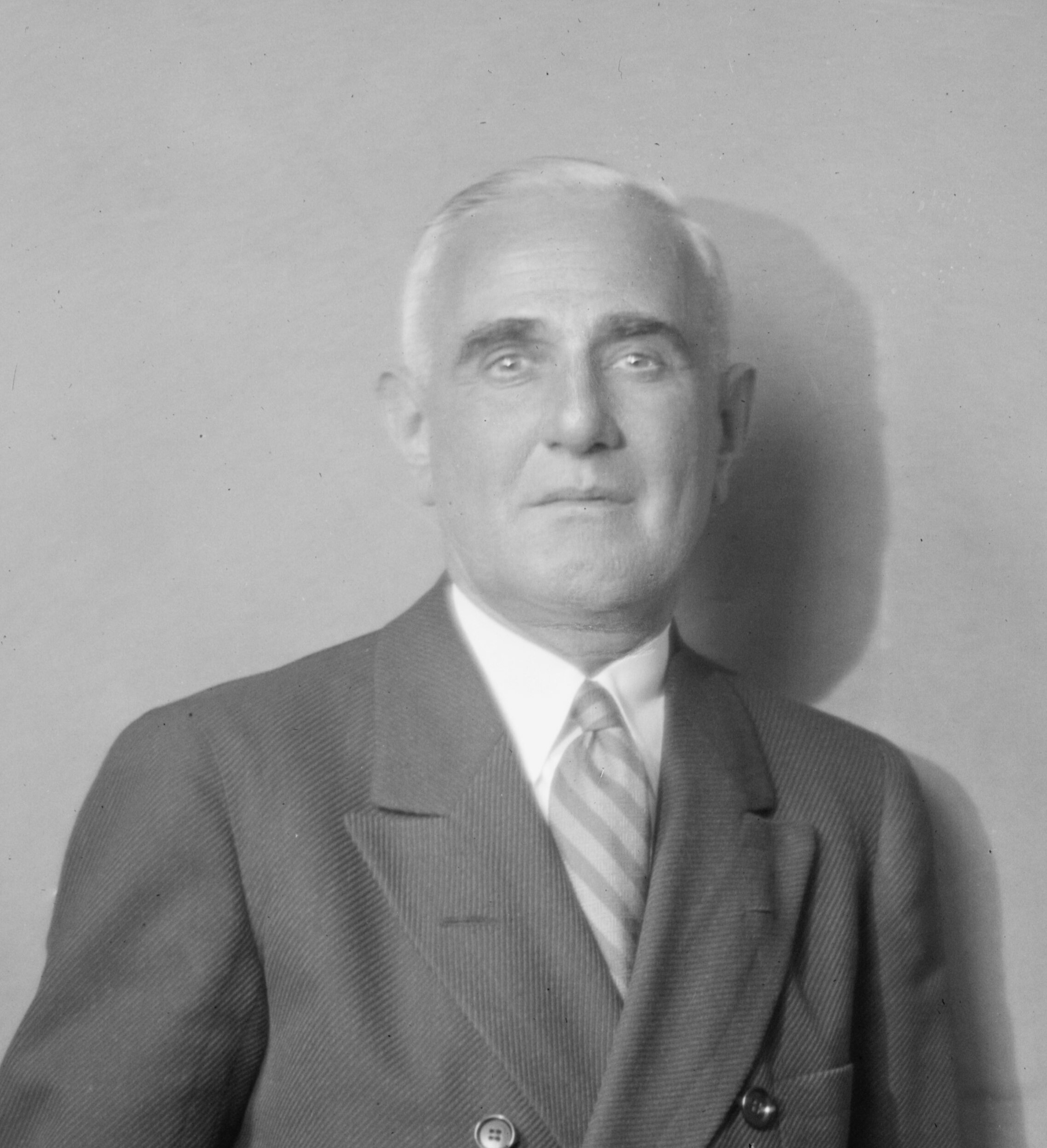
Julius Garfinckel, 1905

Julius Garfinckel (November 5, 1872 – November 5, 1936) was a prominent American merchant, business executive and philanthropist. He was the founder of the Washington, D.C., department store Garfinckel's.

== Biography ==
He was born in Syracuse, New York, the son of Harris Garfinkel (ca. 1835-1894) and Hannah Rachel Harrzon (ca. 1834-1886). His siblings were Nathan Gabriel Garfinkel (1864-?); Suzanne Rebecca Garfinkel (1866-?); Anna Esther Garfinkel (1868–1935); Susan Garfinkel (1869-?); and Usher Garfinkel (ca. 1877-?). His parents were both born in Bavaria, and immigrated to the United States. Their native language was German. His father was a peddler/dry goods merchant. Before Julius was born, the Garfinkel family lived in New Orleans, where his elder siblings were born. They also lived in Texas, where his younger brother was born. Although he was Unitarian, his parents are buried in a Jewish cemetery in Texas. It is not clear when or why he added the letter "c" into his surname.

In 1899, he moved from Denver, to Washington, where he opened a mercantile business named Julius Garfinckel & Co., employing 10 clerks. In 1910, he lived at the Burlington Hotel, 1120 Vermont Avenue NW. In 1918, his store was located at 13th and F Streets. He was still living at the Burlington in 1920. In the late 1920s, Garfinckel had an eight-story department store building erected at the northwest corner of 14th and F Streets for $2,000,000. The new location was opened in 1929. By 1936, there were more than 500 employees.

Garfinckel, who remained single, later lived in an apartment at the Hay-Adams House on 16th Street NW, where he accumulated a valuable collection of rugs and art objects. His sole recreation was horseback riding. He owned a thoroughbred and was a familiar figure on the bridle paths of Rock Creek Park.

One of Washington's public-spirited and generous citizens, he gave liberally to civic and philanthropic enterprises. He was one of the principal supporters financially of his church and the local Boy Scouts chapter, of which he was vice president.

He was a director of the Riggs National Bank and of the Emergency Hospital, and a member of the Washington Board of Trade and the United States Chamber of Commerce. In 1935, accompanied by his nephew, lawyer/politician William T. Pheiffer, he sailed to Europe a final time.

Julius Garfinckel died on his 64th birthday of pneumonia in Washington, D.C. His funeral was held two days later at All Souls Unitarian Church. He is interred in Rock Creek Cemetery.

On November 9, 1936, his will was filed for probate, leaving the bulk of his $6,000,000 estate to charity and employees.
