= Erlebacher's =

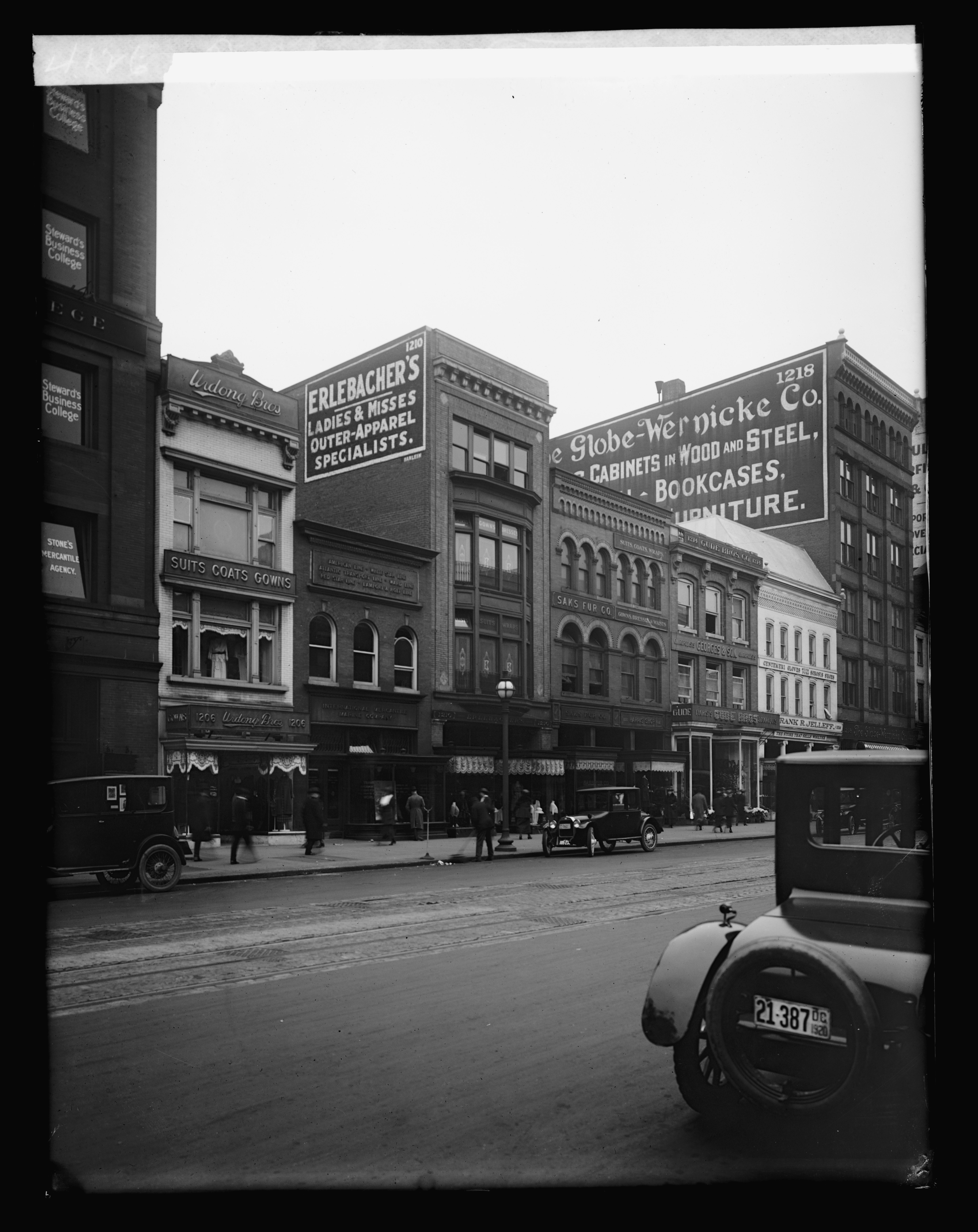
- Erlebacher's in 1920
- Industry: Retail
- Founded: October 14, 1907; 118 years ago (as G. Erlebacher)
- Founder: Gustav Erlbacher
- Defunct: 1974
- Fate: Liquidation
- Headquarters: Washington, D.C., U.S.
- Key people: Gustav Erlbacher, founder
- Products: Fashion apparel, shoes, and accessories
- Parent: Sara Fredericks, Inc.

Erlebacher's was a high-fashion ladies specialty store that operated in Washington, D.C. The location at 1222 F. Street, NW, opened on October 14, 1907, as G. Erlebacher. The owners, Mr. and Mrs. Gustav Erlbacher were buyers for the Hecht Company in Baltimore before opening the store in Washington.

== History ==
In 1914, the store moved to 1210 F. Street, NW. Gustav Erlbacher died in 1924 and Mrs. Erlbacher remarried in 1934 to David Frank. In 1938, the Franks sold the store to Jules Winkelman. In 1949, Erlebacher's opened its store at 1133 Connecticut Avenue, NW, at the corner of Desales Street. The F. Street location closed in 1953. The store changed hands in 1970, when Jacob Epstein Katz purchased it from Jules Winkelman. In 1971, Erlebacher's moved to a new location at 5512 Wisconsin Avenue in Friendship Heights, Maryland. Its former location was occupied by Raleigh's. The Friendship Heights location was innovative in that its 10,000 square feet (930 m^{2}) were occupied by a number of boutique specialty stores including Jandel Furs, Pampillonia Jewelers, and I. Miller shoes. The location was also known as the Holiday Inn Plaza shopping mall.

The store became nationally famous when Jacqueline Bouvier bought much of her trousseau there prior to her marriage to John Fitzgerald Kennedy. In the early 1970s the store garnered widespread publicity by being featured in Time magazine for its innovative display, in the front store windows, of the Time portraits of famous first ladies and American women who had previously appeared in that magazine. This was the inspired brainstorm of then store owner Jacob E. (Buddy) Katz. Source: son of Jacob E. (Buddy) Katz

In 1972, Erlebacher's was purchased by New York-based Sara Fredericks, Inc. The store closed in 1974.

== Advertising ==
A Washington Post ad described Erlebacher's as follows:

Opening - Tomorrow G. Erlebacher throws open the door of his handsome new store. We enter our bid for your favor, giving every assurance that it will be fully earned and eminently appreciated. Our stock consists of exclusive models in women's suits and gowns for afternoon and evening, dainty waists, smart tailor-made skirts, and fine furs. While the styles and goods are exclusive and of the highest class, we have made our prices well within reason, and offer you garments of distinct merit at figures that will be thoroughly appreciated.
