= El Monte Shopping Center =

Shopping center in El Monte, CA

Coordinates: 34.0729196°N 118.0266374°W

The El Monte Shopping Center was a major shopping center, for decades the largest shopping center in El Monte, California, at 400 Peck Road just north of the San Bernardino Freeway. It opened in phases in 1958 and 1959 and was initially anchored by a 263,951-square-foot (24,521.9 m^{2}) Sears plus its 20,000-square-foot (1,900 m^{2}) automotive center as well as a 39,000-square-foot (3,600 m^{2}) Food Giant supermarket, a F. W. Woolworth five and dime, and a Bond's clothing store.

In 1989 Katersky Financial bought the center and at that time tenants included a Home Club home improvement superstore (later HomeBase/Longo Lexus dealership), Tianguis (later Big Kmart/Sears Essentials/Outlet), the Longo Toyota dealership, Thrifty Drug Stores (later Dearden's Furniture), Sizzler, and Big 5 Sporting Goods.

The Sears Outlet store closed in 2012. The vacant Dearden's and Sears Outlet buildings were later converted to a Target store.

The location now functions as a community shopping center and is home to Target, Planet Fitness, Wendy’s, Jamba Juice and the future home of Starbucks, Raising Cane’s and In-N-Out Burger.
