= Garfinckel's =

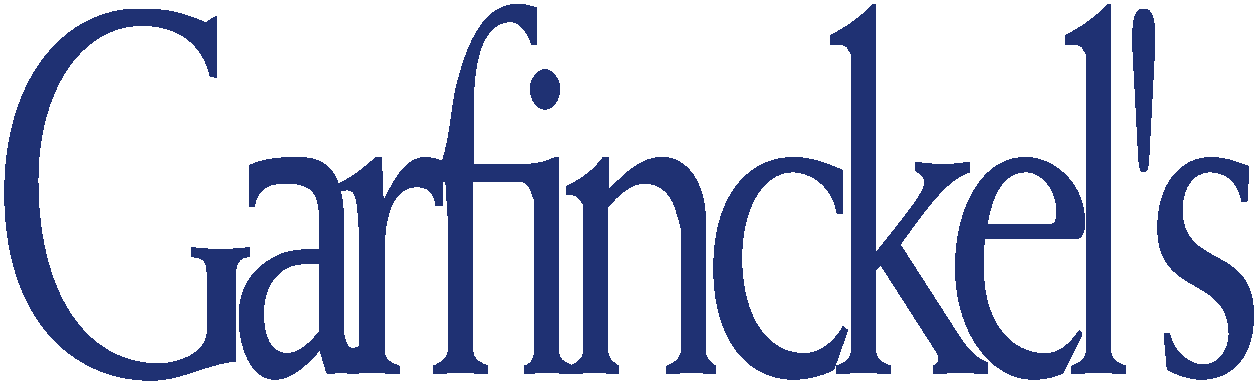
- Industry: Retail
- Founded: 1905
- Defunct: 1990
- Fate: Bankruptcy
- Headquarters: Washington, D.C.
- Key people: Julius Garfinckel, founder
- Products: Clothing, footwear, bedding, furniture, jewelry, beauty products, housewares

- Garfinckel's Department Store
- U.S. National Register of Historic Places
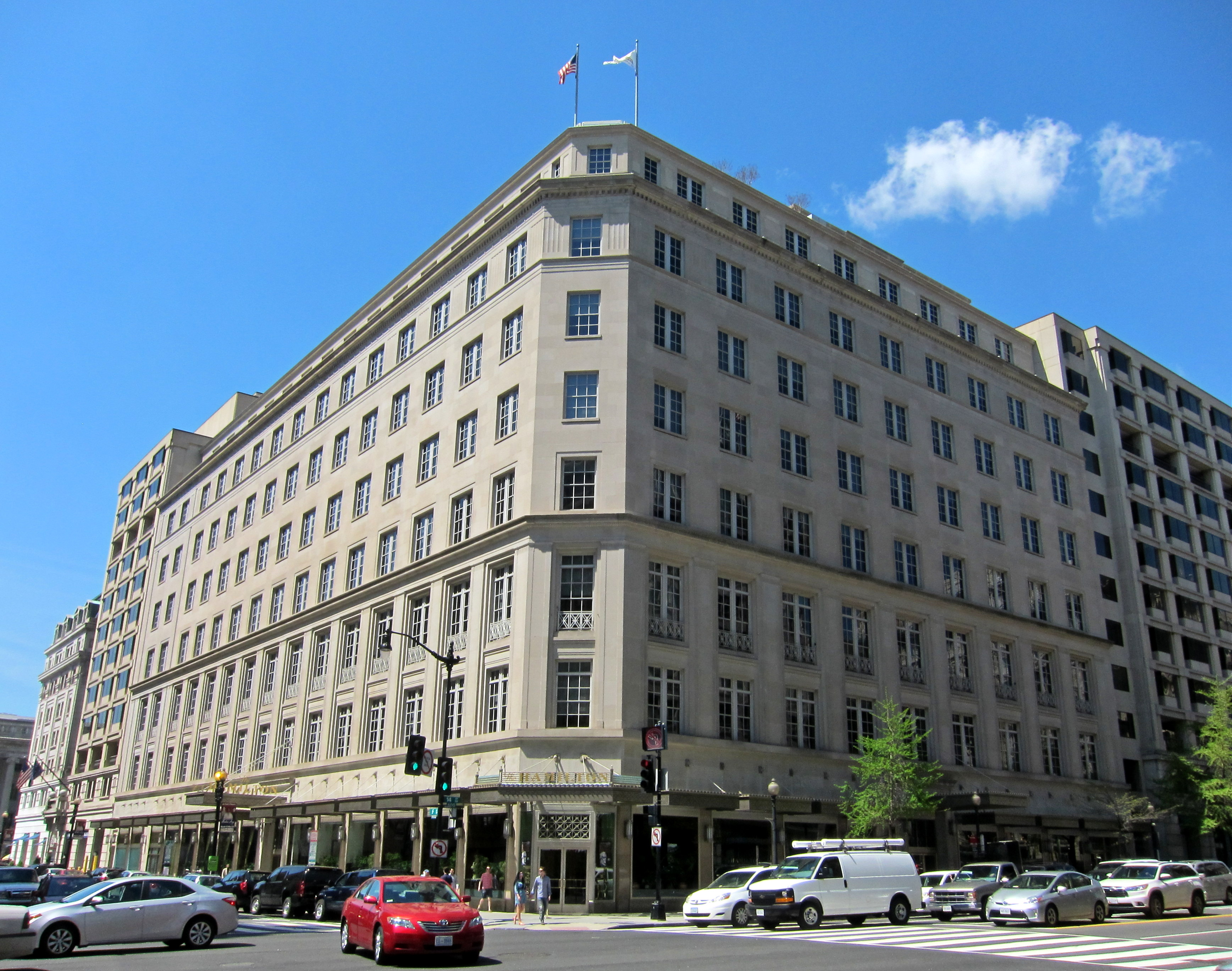
- Building in 2015

- Location within Central Washington, D.C. Location within the District of Columbia Location within the United States
- Location: 1401 F Street, Northwest, Washington, D.C.
- Coordinates: 38°53′50.38″N 77°1′55.4″W
- Area: (less than 1 acre (4,000 m^{2})
- Built: 1925–1929
- Architects: Porter and Lockie, Starrett & van Vleck
- Architectural style: Moderne
- NRHP reference No.: 95000353
- Added to NRHP: April 4, 1995

Garfinckel's was a prominent department store chain based in Washington, D.C. that catered to a clientele of wealthy consumers. Its flagship store at 14th and F in the city's F Street shopping district is listed on the National Register. It filed for Chapter 11 bankruptcy in June 1990 and ceased operations that year.

== History ==
This retail mercantile business was founded in 1905, as Julius Garfinkle & Co. by Julius Garfinckel (1872–1936), originally employing 10 clerks. The store opened on October 2, 1905, at 1226 F St. NW in Washington, D.C. By August 1924, the spelling of the store name was modified to Julius Garfinckel & Co. In 1946, it acquired the men's specialty retailer, Brooks Brothers and in 1950, De Pinna. It formed the national retail conglomerate, Garfinckel, Brooks Brothers, Miller & Rhoads, Inc., after acquisition of the Miller & Rhoads chain in 1967. In 1977, the conglomerate acquired the Ann Taylor women's fashion store chain. In 1981, the conglomerate consisted of close to 190 stores in seven chains. That same year, Allied Stores acquired Garfinckel, Brooks Brothers, Miller & Rhoads, Inc. for $228 million. In 1986, Campeau Corp. acquired Allied, and in turn sold the Garfinckel's chain to locally owned Raleigh's for $95 million (~$236 million in 2025), forming Garfinckel's, Raleigh's & Co.

Garfinckel's grew and expanded into a chain of stores, but was eventually pushed into financial collapse due to a series of mergers and acquisitions. On June 21, 1990, the company filed for Chapter 11 bankruptcy by its chairman and CEO George P. Kelly and went out of business.

== Flagship store ==
In 1918, the store was located at 13th and F Streets at the western end of the city's downtown shopping district. An eight-story department store building was erected at the northwest corner of 14th and F Streets, across from the Willard Hotel, and opened in 1929. The $2,000,000 structure was designed by architects Starrett & van Vleck of New York. By 1936, there were more than 500 employees.

After Garfinckel's bankruptcy in 1990, the store remained vacant for several years until it was redeveloped in 1999. In 1995, it was placed on the National Register of Historic Places. From 1997 to 1999, the property was redeveloped into a modern office building and shopping center named Hamilton Square.

Borders was a street level tenant until it closed in 2010. The building owner considered a restaurant and retail store to occupy the space.

== Branch stores ==
Unlike its local retail competitors, the Hecht Company, Woodward & Lothrop, and Lord & Taylor, Garfinckel's did not open numerous suburban locations during the heyday of the 1950s and 1960s. The first suburban store was an original anchor at the Seven Corners Shopping Center upon opening in 1956. After that, its Montgomery Mall store opened in 1968. It also operated a 35,000-square-foot (3,300 m^{2}) Spring Valley Shopping Center store in the Spring Valley section of Washington, D.C., at 4820 Massachusetts Avenue. This was followed by store openings in May 1970, a 30,000-square-foot (2,800 m^{2}) location at Tyson's Corner Center; a 90,000-square-foot (8,400 m^{2}) location at Landover Mall on May 11, 1972; and a second hotel location - a 600-square-foot (56 m^{2}) store in the Washington Hilton, opened July 1972. The Springfield Mall store opened in January 1973.

Convinced that the company had expanded enough and that the premiere 170,000-square-foot (16,000 m^{2}) downtown location would continue to prosper, Garfinckel's did not expand again until the early-1980s. Stores opened in the early 1980s at Annapolis Mall, Fair Oaks Mall, and a 16,000-square-foot (1,500 m^{2}) store at The Shops at Georgetown Park. These would be the last new Garfinckel's suburban locations. After allowing its lease to expire at the Tyson's Corner store at the end of 1988, Garfinckel's announced plans to open a second downtown Washington store at 1130 Connecticut Ave, NW; then the site of a temporary Raleigh's location. Nine locations were in operation at the time of filing for Chapter 11 bankruptcy in 1990.

The Garfinckel's Department Store Records are held at the Library of Congress.
