= Garfinckel, Brooks Brothers, Miller & Rhoads =

Retail conglomerate (1967-1981)

Garfinckel, Brooks Brothers, Miller & Rhoads, Inc.
- Company type: Retail conglomerate
- Founded: 1967
- Defunct: 1981
- Headquarters: Washington, D.C.

Garfinckel, Brooks Brothers, Miller & Rhoads, Inc. was a Washington, D.C.–based national retail conglomerate that existed from 1967 to 1981.

== History ==
The conglomerate was formed in 1967, when the Julius Garfinckel & Co., who in 1946, had purchased the men's specialty retailer Brooks Brothers, acquired the Richmond, Virginia–based Miller & Rhoads chain. The conglomerate operated 29 department and specialty stores in its four divisions in 1968. The fourth division was De Pinna. In 1950, Garfinckel's had acquired the De Pinna stores, but closed the three apparel stores in that division in 1969. That same year, it acquired the six-store chain of Miller, Inc. of Knoxville, Tennessee. That chain was later renamed Miller's of Tennessee in 1973, after acquisition of Miller Brothers of Chattanooga.

The conglomerate continued to expand during the 1970s and became an extremely profitable enterprise. As part of an "aggressive expansion" program, the Washington, D.C.–based Joseph R. Harris Co. was acquired in 1971; an 11 store apparel chain with nine stores in the Washington area and stores in Atlanta, Georgia and Charlotte, North Carolina. That chain was also a locally owned Washington D.C.–based apparel retailer whose founder, Joseph R. Harris, had close ties to the Garfinckel leadership. The following year, Harzfeld's a Kansas City, Missouri–based chain of six women's and children's high-end apparel stores was acquired for $3 million. In 1973, the conglomerate operated 66 stores in 14 state and the District of Columbia. After acquiring two Gus Meyer stores in Oklahoma City and Tulsa, Oklahoma in 1974 (to be folded into Harzfeld's), there were 86 stores nationwide. In 1977, the conglomerate executed a major expansion with acquisition of the 27 store Ann Taylor women's fashion store chain and 73 Catherine's Stout Shoppe stores, a chain specializing in large size fashion apparel. The former was acquired that year for $14 million and the latter for $23.4 million. That year, the company consisted of 192 retail units. Despite the economic downturn in 1976–77, the conglomerate was the most profitable in its history.

Given its profitability, the public corporation received a lot of attention on Wall Street. In 1978, the Minneapolis, Minnesota–based retailer Gamble-Skogmo, Inc. attempted a takeover; the third such attempt during 1977–78. Gamble-Skogmo purchased a 20-percent share from the Joseph R. Harris family, thereby gaining a controlling interest in the conglomerate. A court suit resulted in an agreement that Gamble-Skogmo would not acquire any more stock in Garfinckel. The following year, Garfinckel sold the Joseph R. Harris Co., then renamed Harris & Friends, to the Petrie Stores Corp. of Cleveland, Ohio. At the time, Harris had 26 stores in Maryland, Virginia, North Carolina, Pennsylvania, Georgia, and the District of Columbia.

The conglomerate's last major acquisition was of the seven store, Texas-based fashion specialty Frost Bros. chain for $27.2 million in 1980. In 1981, the conglomerate consisted of close to 190 stores in seven chains. Initially, Garfinckel's had been negotiating with Allied to sell its 22 Miller & Rhoads department stores. In August of that year, Allied Stores acquired Garfinckel, Brooks Brothers, Miller & Rhoads, Inc. for $228 million. With that transaction they acquired 178 department stores and 48 specialty shops in 28 states. The real reason why Allied bought the conglomerate was that through its due diligence, they ascertained that Brooks Brothers was the most profitable asset in the portfolio as they had surmised. Allied kept Brooks Brothers and liquidated the rest of the company.

== Corporate Divisions ==
- Ann Taylor – New York (acquired 1977)
- Brooks Brothers – New York (original division, purchased by Garfinckel's in 1946)
- Catherine's Stout Shoppe – Nashville, Tennessee–based chain (acquired 1977)
- De Pinna – New York (original division, purchased by Garfinckel's in 1950, closed 1969; stores operated at Fifth Avenue and 52nd Street, New York; Eastchester, New York; and Fort Lauderdale, Florida)
- Frost Bros. – Texas (acquired 1980)
- Garfinckel's – Washington, D.C.
- Harzfeld's – Kansas City, Missouri (acquired 1972)
- Joseph R. Harris Co. –Washington, D.C. (acquired 1971, sold 1979, to Petrie Stores)
- Miller & Rhoads – Richmond, Virginia
- Miller Brothers of Chattanooga – Chattanooga, Tennessee (acquired 1969, combined in 1973 with Miller's Inc.)
- Miller, Inc. – Knoxville, Tennessee (acquired 1969, combined in 1973 with Miller Brothers of Chattanooga)
- Miller's Department Store – (formed August 1, 1973, from consolidation of Miller Brothers of Chattanooga and Miller, Inc.; at formation had 11 stores and 2 specialty shops in eastern Tennessee, Georgia, Virginia, and North Carolina)
