= Little Saigon, Arlington, Virginia =

Former ethnic enclave in Arlington, Virginia

- Neighborhood
- Clarendon, Arlington, Virginia
- Location within Northern Virginia Location within Virginia Location within the United States
- Coordinates: 38°53′12″N 77°05′35″W
- Country: United States of America
- State: Virginia
- County: Arlington
- Time zone: UTC-5 (EST)
  - Summer (DST): UTC-4 (EDT)
- ZIP codes: 22201
- Area codes: 703 and 571

Little Saigon was a Vietnamese ethnic enclave in the Clarendon neighborhood of Arlington County, Virginia, which served the large refugee population that immigrated after the Fall of Saigon on April 30, 1975. One of many Little Saigons in the U.S., this neighborhood near Washington, D.C., became a hub of Vietnamese commerce and social activity, and reached its peak during the late 1970s to the early 1980s. The opening of the Clarendon station on the Washington Metro's Orange Line led to new development and higher rents; many businesses closed or moved, notably to the nearby Eden Center.

== Influx of Vietnamese ==
Toward the end of the Vietnam War in the 1970s, immigration from Vietnam to the United States increased considerably. Before 1975, only about 15,000 Vietnamese immigrants lived in the United States. By 1980, about 245,000 Vietnamese lived in the U.S., with about 91 percent of the population arriving in the previous five years.

Vietnamese immigrants fled their country in two distinct waves. The first large wave of immigration occurred in 1975 and included elites and highly educated residents who left with the fall of Saigon. Many left in fear for their lives or were escaping imprisonment as they had either worked for the former South Vietnamese government or supported the regime. For Vietnamese who lived through the war and under Communist control, many mistrusted banks and feared the volatility of paper money; keeping money in the form of gold or jewelry was common.

From the mid-1970s to the early 1990s, most refugees left Vietnam by boat. These refugees, commonly referred to as "boat people," were generally less educated than the previous wave of immigrants who had ties to the U.S. government or were Vietnamese elites. An estimated 800,000 people fled Vietnam by boat between 1975 and 1995 and, according to the United Nations High Commission for Refugees, between 200,000 and 400,000 boat people died at sea.

The Washington metropolitan area was a desirable choice for Vietnamese immigrants to settle for several reasons. Many of the first-wave Vietnamese immigrants had ties to the U.S. government or the embassy. Northern Virginia emerged as a suitable location within the region for resettlement for several reasons. Embassy officials pointed refugees toward Northern Virginia, and Arlington offered the availability of sponsors such as the Catholic Church. Once the first wave of immigrants settled in Arlington, existing family and social ties established the network for future immigrants to join this population. By the end of the Vietnam War, 15%, or 3,000, of the nation's Vietnamese population resided in the Washington, D.C. area, and many more joined. The most densely settled Vietnamese areas in Northern Virginia were along Wilson Boulevard and Columbia Pike, extending west towards Falls Church and Annandale.

== Development in Clarendon ==
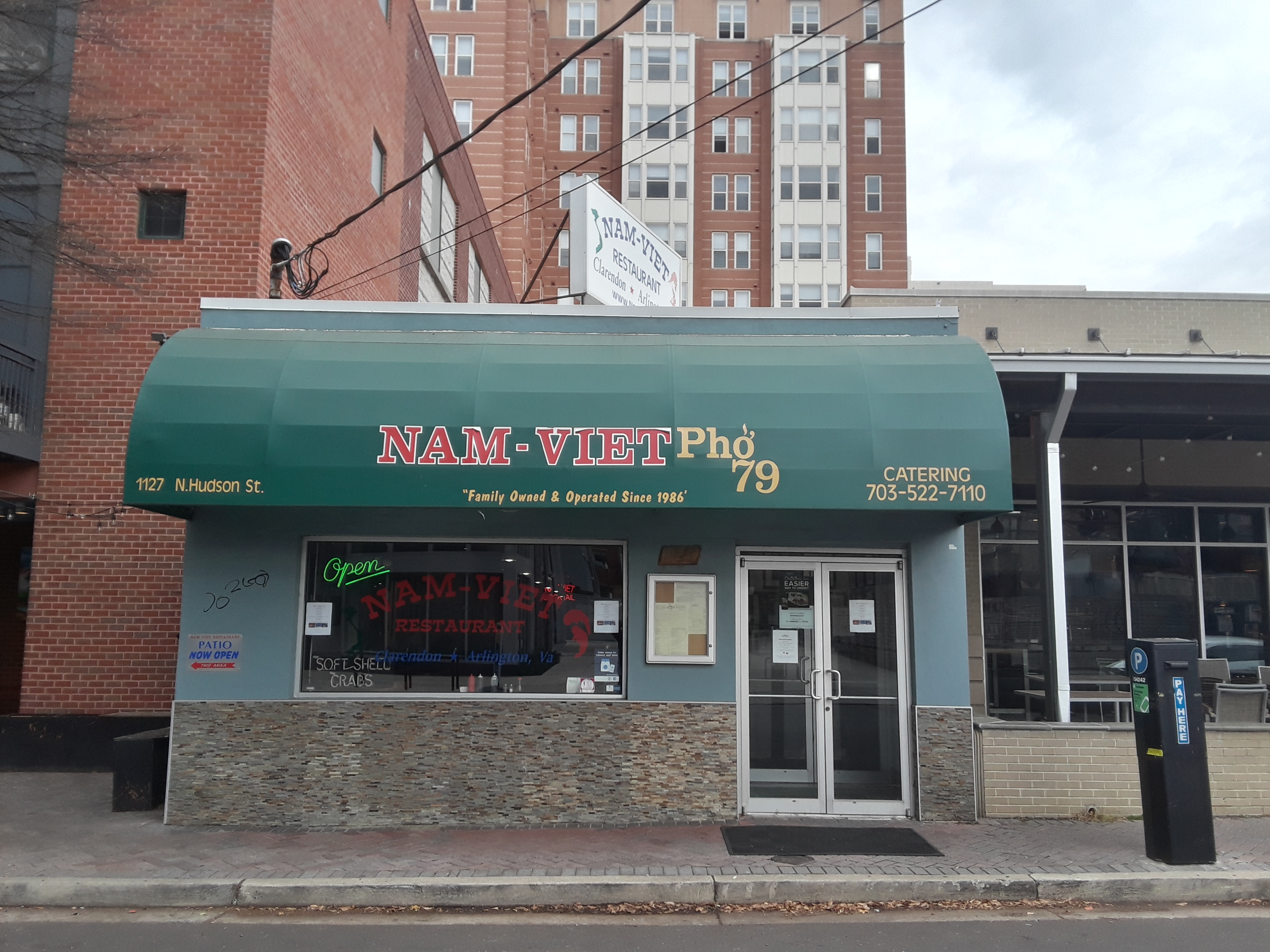
Nam-Viet Restaurant in Little Saigon in December 2021

Until the mid-1900s, Clarendon was Arlington County's premier downtown shopping area and a bustling streetcar suburb. However, during the 1960s and 70s, competition from regional shopping malls and strip shopping centers caused downtown Clarendon to decline. Many businesses relocated, leaving behind vacant storefronts. The historic building stock suffered from neglect and by the mid-1970s, construction of the WMATA Clarendon Metro station began to tear up the streets and sidewalks. These conditions were conducive to cheap, short-term commercial leases, which the Vietnamese refugees seized as an opportunity to open businesses and support their families. In light of the Metro construction, rent fell as low as $1.50 to $5 a square foot in some buildings, making this area economically attractive for the recently immigrated population.

The first Vietnamese business, the Saigon Market grocery store, opened in 1972 by a former employee of the Vietnamese Embassy, and a second grocery store, Vietnam Center, was opened by the Vietnamese wife of a CIA employee. Soon more Vietnamese people began to open shops and restaurants in Clarendon, and the area was transformed into the hub of the East Coast Vietnamese community. Refugee assistance groups and churches organized trips that brought immigrants from Alexandria and elsewhere to Clarendon to shop.

Shops opened to sell specialized goods to the Vietnamese community. Major attractions were the Vietnamese grocery stores, which sold ingredients unavailable in American markets.

Little Saigon offered a variety of business types and styles. Some businesses developed the ambiance of a flea market or bazaar since it was common for multiple businesses to operate within a single building. My An Fabric store had multiple businesses within the same building, including a billiards and arcade game room and a small cafe Priest.

Festivals and events were held throughout the year to celebrate holidays, such as the annual Moon Festival. For 19 years, successful restaurateur Nguyen Van Thoi hosted an annual Tet dinner at his Nam Viet and My An cafes for American prisoners of war from the Vietnam War.

Kim Cook established the Vietnamese Resettlement Association in Falls Church and Khuc Minh Tho founded the Families of Vietnamese Political Prisoners Association.

Vietnamese entrepreneurs faced many hurdles as they tried to achieve success in Clarendon. Because banks would not lend to them, Vietnamese entrepreneurs had to borrow money from friends and family to start their businesses, often at higher interest rates than what was commercially available. Some business owners experienced regulatory hurdles because they didn't understand the business licensing and regulations, and were fined. To raise capital, some immigrants had to sell off much of their family's gold and jewelry. One traditional Vietnamese lending practice known as "hoi" was a common funding tool. Hoi pools money from businesspeople in the community and distributes it to a member of the community in a monthly bidding process. The loan candidate who bids the highest interest rate for the entire pot gets the money.

Over time, the Vietnamese-American business community increased its efficacy. For example, Toa Do, who worked his way up from his first American job as a messenger to a systems analyst and then an independent consultant, became the first Vietnamese person to have a seat on the Arlington Chamber of Commerce. The Clarendon Vietnamese Retail Business Association was formed by Kham Dinh Do, proprietor of the Dat Hung jewelry store, who tried to organize the Vietnamese business community and advocate on behalf of their interests as Arlington County government was planning for the development of Clarendon.

== Decline ==
The neighborhood declined for several reasons. Many building owners did not spend money maintaining or updating their buildings because they were waiting for the Metro station to open and new economic opportunities to be realized through the redevelopment of Clarendon. Development didn't increase significantly in Clarendon for the first few years after Metro opened in 1979. There were multiple small parcels of land held by absentee owners that made it difficult for developers to purchase areas large enough for the new, big projects that were envisioned. On November 18, 1989, the Arlington County Board unanimously endorsed Clarendon's redevelopment plan, which envisioned high-rise commercial structures, mid-rise residential buildings, parks, and pedestrian walkways. The plan also proposed incentives for constructing buildings lower than zoning code allowed and to carve out smaller-scaled commercial space for smaller-scaled businesses.

Eventually, rents began to increase in Clarendon (up to $25–30 a square foot in some commercial buildings), and Vietnamese were displaced from Arlington. The Vietnamese population that settled in the garden apartments of Arlington moved westward, with many settling around Seven Corners, as well as Falls Church near the intersection of Graham Road and Arlington Boulevard. Vietnamese-American residents had dispersed from Arlington along with the Vietnamese-American businesses. By 1984, 60% of Vietnamese-Americans lived within three miles of Seven Corners.

Gradually, the number of Vietnamese businesses in Little Saigon contracted. In 1989, the Clarendon Alliance, a business association, noted that of the 76 businesses in Clarendon, between 30 and 35 were Asian-owned, and among those, most were Vietnamese-owned. The establishments ranged from food markets, real estate and insurance agencies, law and accounting firms, and restaurants and retailers. That same year, the Mekong Center grocery store, the Pacific Oriental Department Store, the My An 1 restaurant and the Alpha Camera repair shop left the Hartford Building, which was then demolished. The My An fabric store relocated from the building before it was demolished since the owner anticipated changes in Clarendon with the plan for high-density development.

Business remained steady for the establishments that remained, although the once-large crowds of Vietnamese customers dwindled, and the neighborhood's value as a community meeting ground had dissipated. Author Alan Ehrenhalt points out that for the economically struggling Clarendon of the 1960s, "it was immigration that brought those old buildings to life... The vacant storefronts brought the Vietnamese in and set the whole process in motion. It may seem a bit ironic that the way to bring in more affluent white newcomers is to lay down a base of poorer people from other countries. But that is exactly what happened in Arlington".

The decline of Little Saigon was noticeable. A letter to the editor of the Washington Post lamented the small business culture that was fading from Clarendon. The writer recognized the contributions of the Vietnamese people and the diversity they brought to Arlington. County planners explained that the government discussed plans for many years that would turn Clarendon into a higher-density, mixed-use corridor that would have larger development projects and bigger retail spaces. Planners noted the current change and inevitability of pressure on the small businesses from development. Long-time customers and business owners have mixed sentiments about the end of Little Saigon. Some business owners expressed resentment and frustration that they were being pushed out. Other business owners were able to relocate to shopping centers that offered better parking and maintained properties.

Efforts were made to retain the ethnic small business community, although they weren't endeavored until after the predominant decline of Little Saigon. In 1993, Arlington County published a bilingual (English and Vietnamese) guide to starting a business in Arlington, which was targeted to Vietnamese business people. Arlington County has since initiated ongoing small business assistance through the Economic Development Authority, which is a recommendation in the 2006 Clarendon Sector Plan.

The development subsequent to the decline of Little Saigon typically has larger footprints, such as 3,000 square feet, which typically are not suitable for small, independently owned businesses. As of 2026, the Nam-Viet restaurant is the only Vietnamese business remaining from the original Little Saigon community.

== Eden Center ==
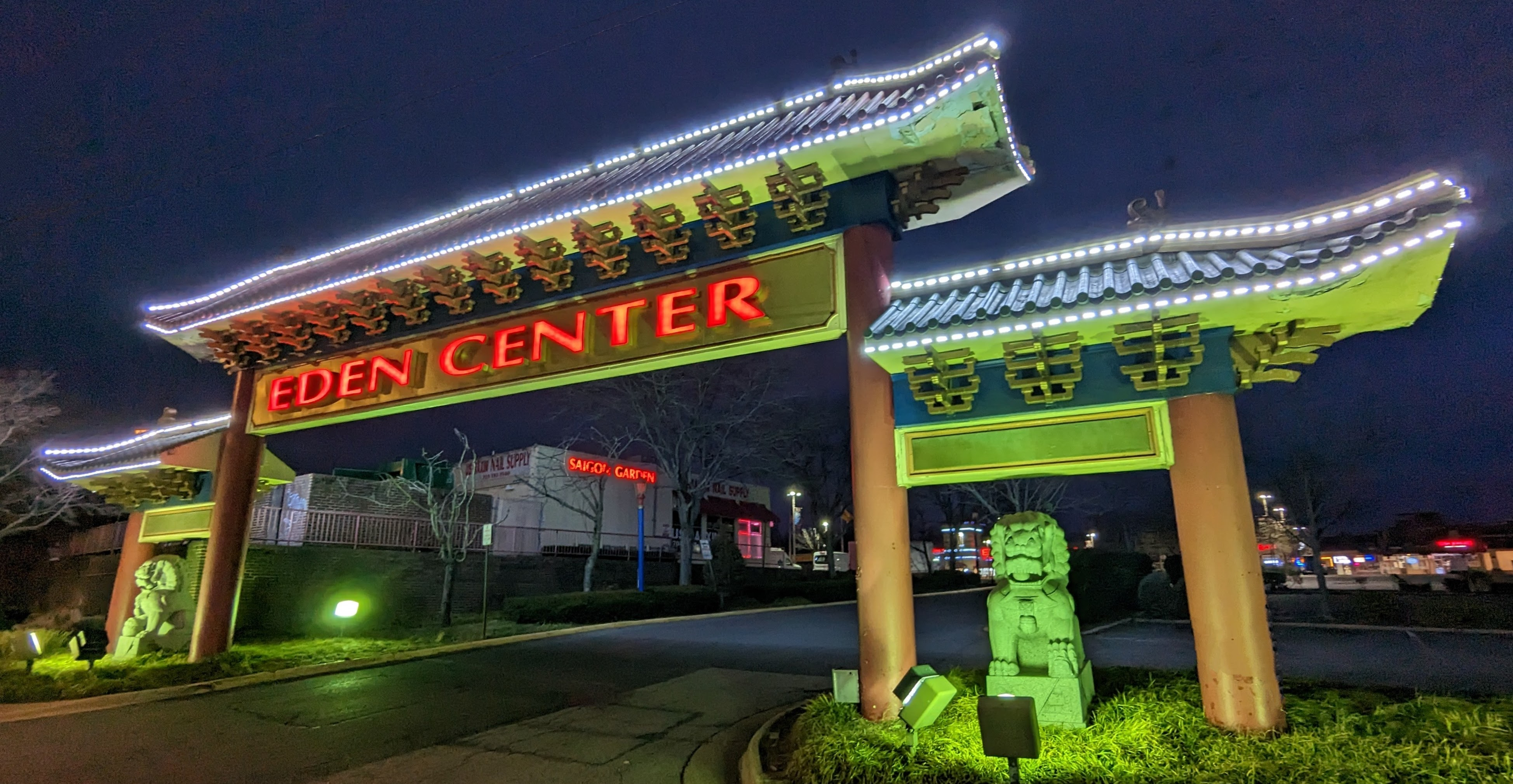
Eden Center in Seven Corners, Virginia

In 1984, the Eden Center shopping mall in the Seven Corners area of Falls Church opened, bringing 20,000 square feet of affordable retail space to the area. Many business owners in Little Saigon relocated to Eden Center.

In 1997, 32,400 square feet was added to the Eden Shopping Center, as well as an iconic clock tower, and at the time it was the largest Vietnamese shopping district in the U.S. The Eden Center became a hub of Vietnamese commerce and activity. In 2007, "Exit Saigon, Enter Little Saigon," a traveling Smithsonian Asian Pacific American Center exhibit, was temporarily located in Eden Center to tell the story of the Vietnamese American immigration and acclimation experience in America. The Eden Center is now regarded as the central place for Vietnamese services and goods in Northern Virginia, as well as the entire East Coast. As of 2023, the Eden Center hosts 115 businesses, most of them owned or operated by members of the Vietnamese community.

== Preservation work ==
In 2014, the Arlington County Public Library, local historians, and master's degree students from Virginia Tech’s Urban Affairs and Planning Program (National Capital Region) collaborated on a project to collect the stories of the Vietnamese community who immigrated to, shopped at, or owned businesses in Arlington's Clarendon neighborhood when it was known as "Little Saigon" during the late 1970s and early 1980s. Directed by Dr. Elizabeth Morton, a student team conducted oral histories, and participants donated photographs and multimedia, which have since been archived at the Arlington County Library's Center for Local History. Numerous members of the Vietnamese-American community participated in this project to share their memories and input on this culturally significant ethnic enclave. The student team recommended the creation of a historical marker or monument to commemorate Little Saigon and recognize the contributions of the Vietnamese refugees to Arlington's heritage and business community.

== See also ==
- Immigration to the United States
