= Spring Valley Shopping Center =

- Square 1500
- U.S. National Register of Historic Places
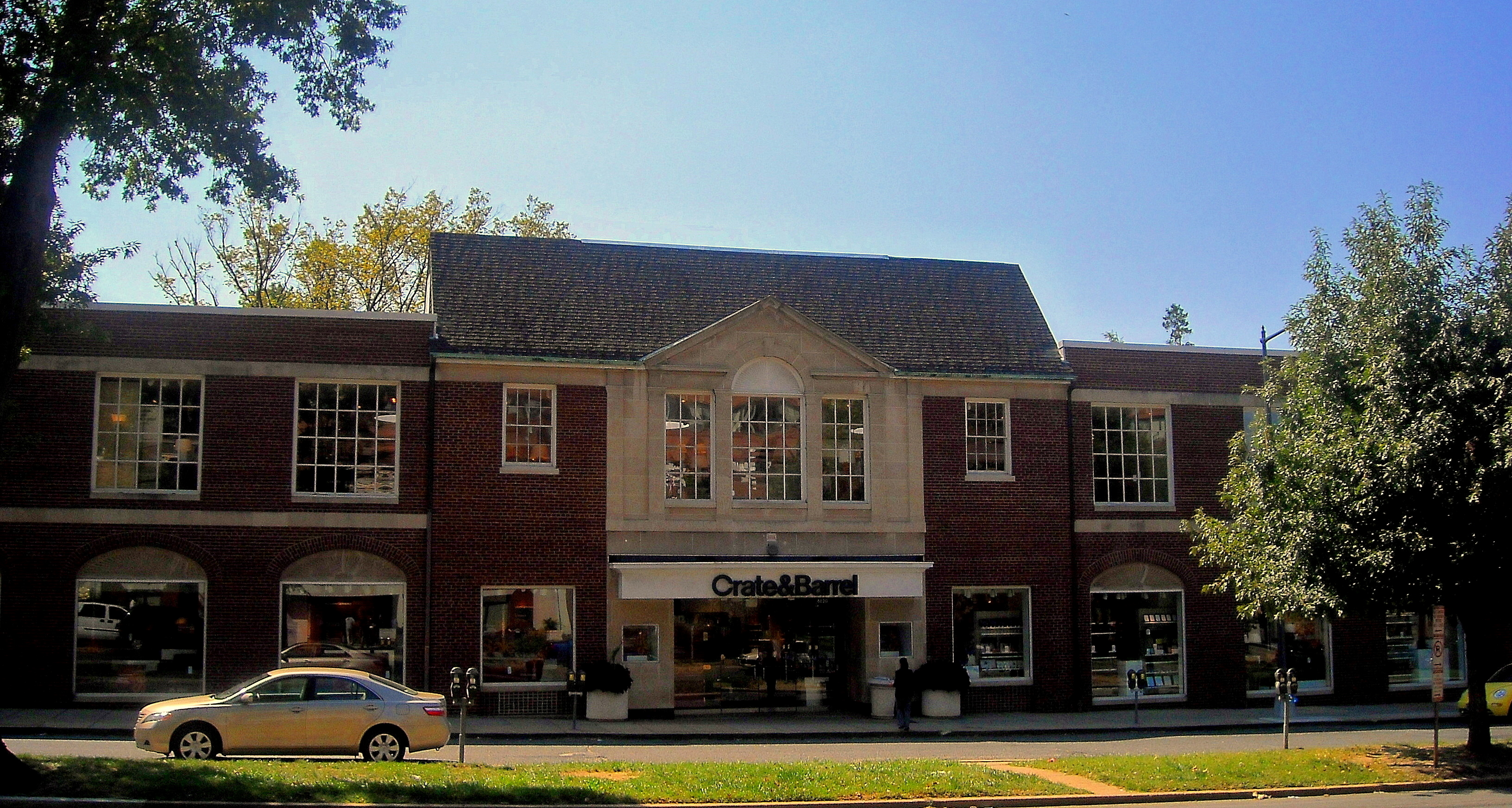
- Square 1500 in 2008

- Location within District of Columbia
- Location: 4820, 4860, 4872, 4874 Massachusetts Avenue, and 4301 49th Street, N.W. Washington, D.C.
- Coordinates: 38°56′40.82″N 77°5′42.81″W
- Built: 1939
- Architect: A.C. Miller
- Architectural style: Colonial Revival
- NRHP reference No.: 03000731
- Added to NRHP: August 7, 2003

The Spring Valley Shopping Center is an historic shopping center, located at 4820, 4860, 4872, 4874 Massachusetts Avenue and 4301 49th Street, Northwest, Washington, D.C., in the Spring Valley neighborhood.

== History ==
It was designed by A.C. Miller in 1939; the Colonial Revival buildings were originally known as the Spring Valley Shopping Center.

Original tenants included Esso, D.G.S. Market, Garfinckel's Department Store (Spring Valley Branch), and other retailers.

The buildings were added to the National Register of Historic Places on August 7, 2003. Current tenants include Crate & Barrel, Bank of America, Capital One Bank (formerly Chevy Chase Bank), Starbucks Coffee, and Le Pain Quotidien.

In 2015, Washington Real Estate Investment Trust announced development plans.
