= Eden Center =

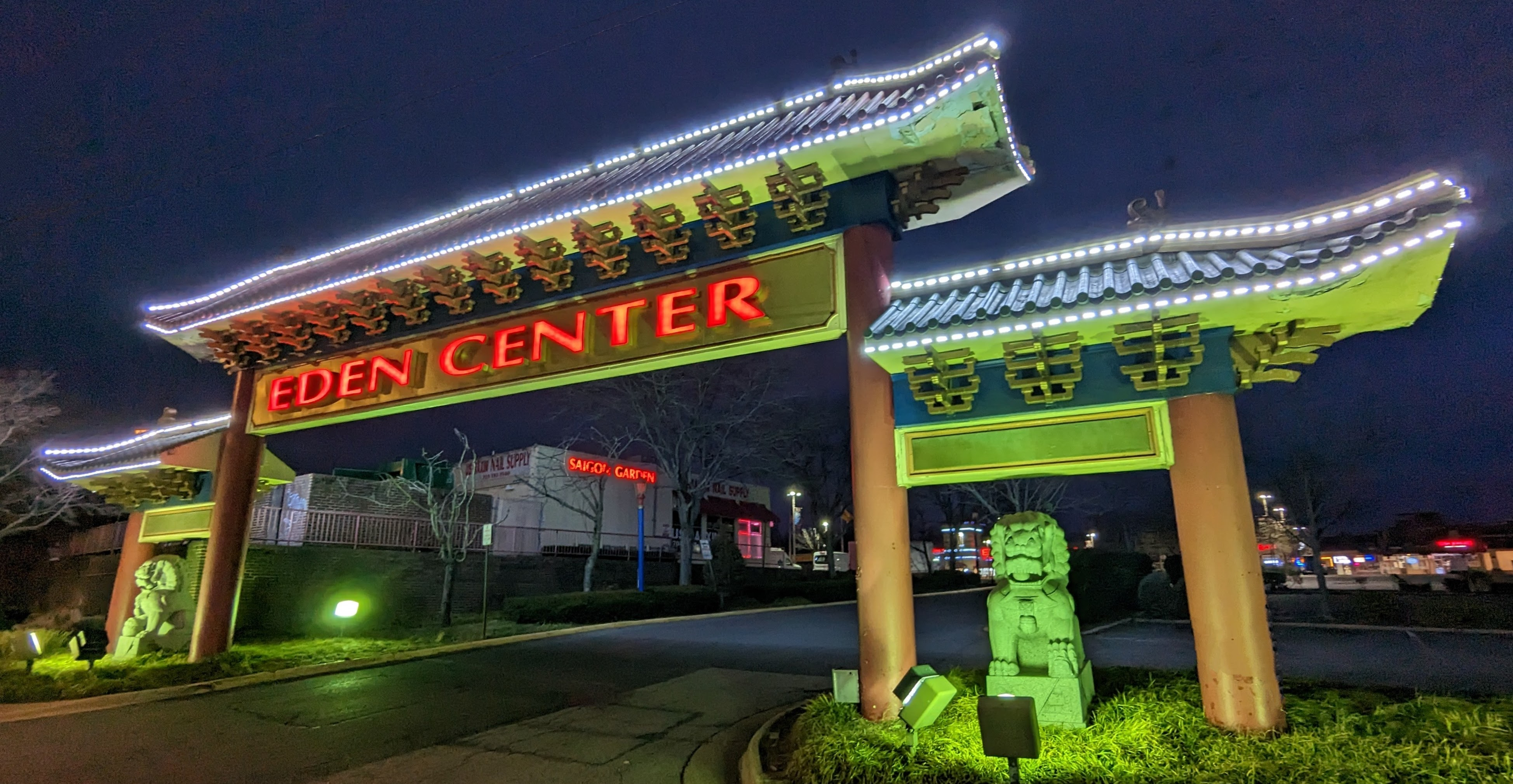
- Eden Center archway at night in 2023
- Location: Falls Church, Virginia, United States
- Coordinates: 38°52′25″N 77°9′14″W
- Address: 6751-6799 Wilson Blvd., Falls Church, VA 22044
- Opened: 1984
- Owner: Douglas Ebenstein, Capital Commercial Properties
- Num. of stores: 120+
- Floor area: 200,000 sq ft (19,000 m^{2})
- Floors: 2, split level with most businesses in front and some in back
- Parking: 1,100 spaces
- Website: edencenter.com

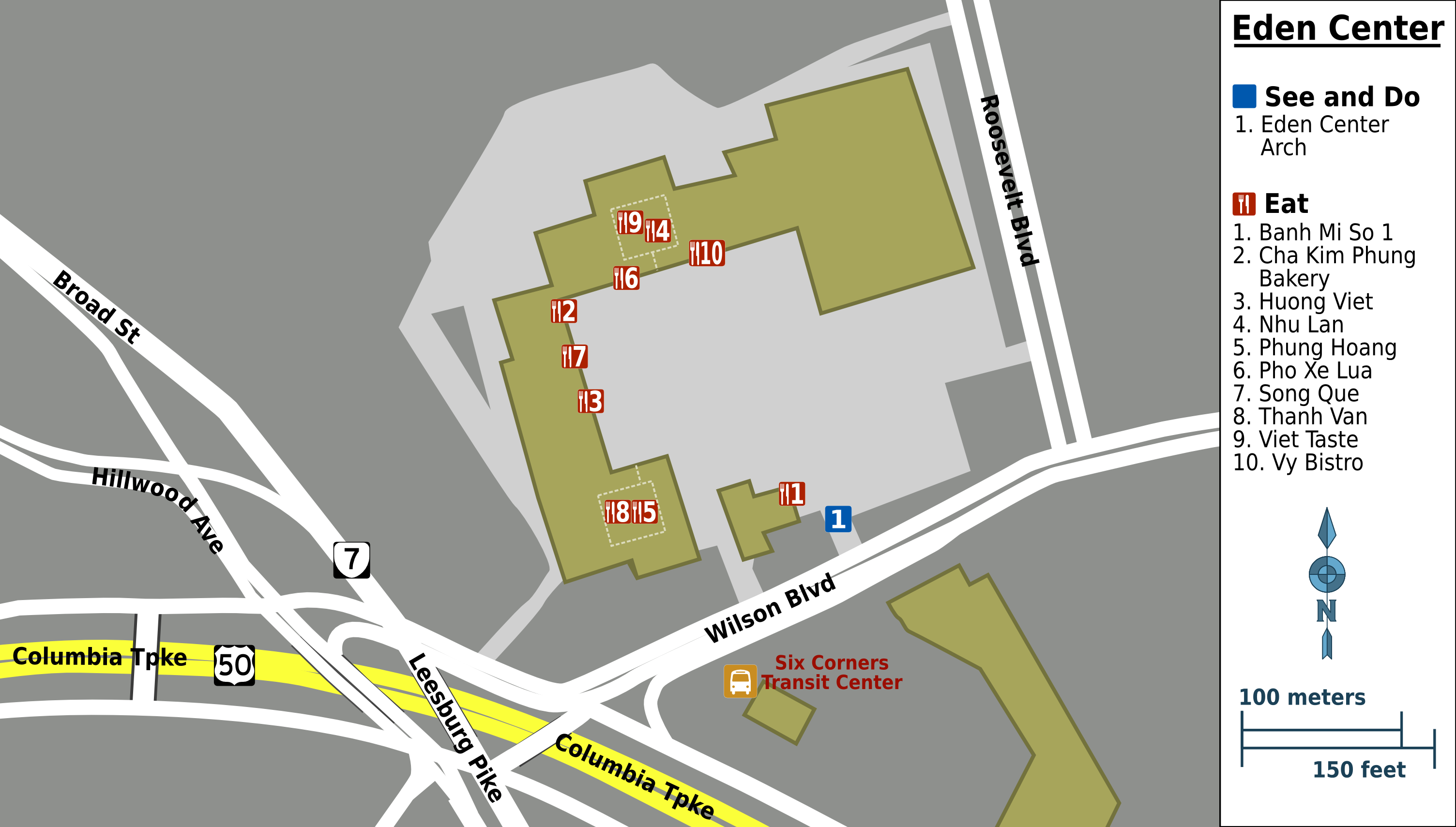
Eden Center map

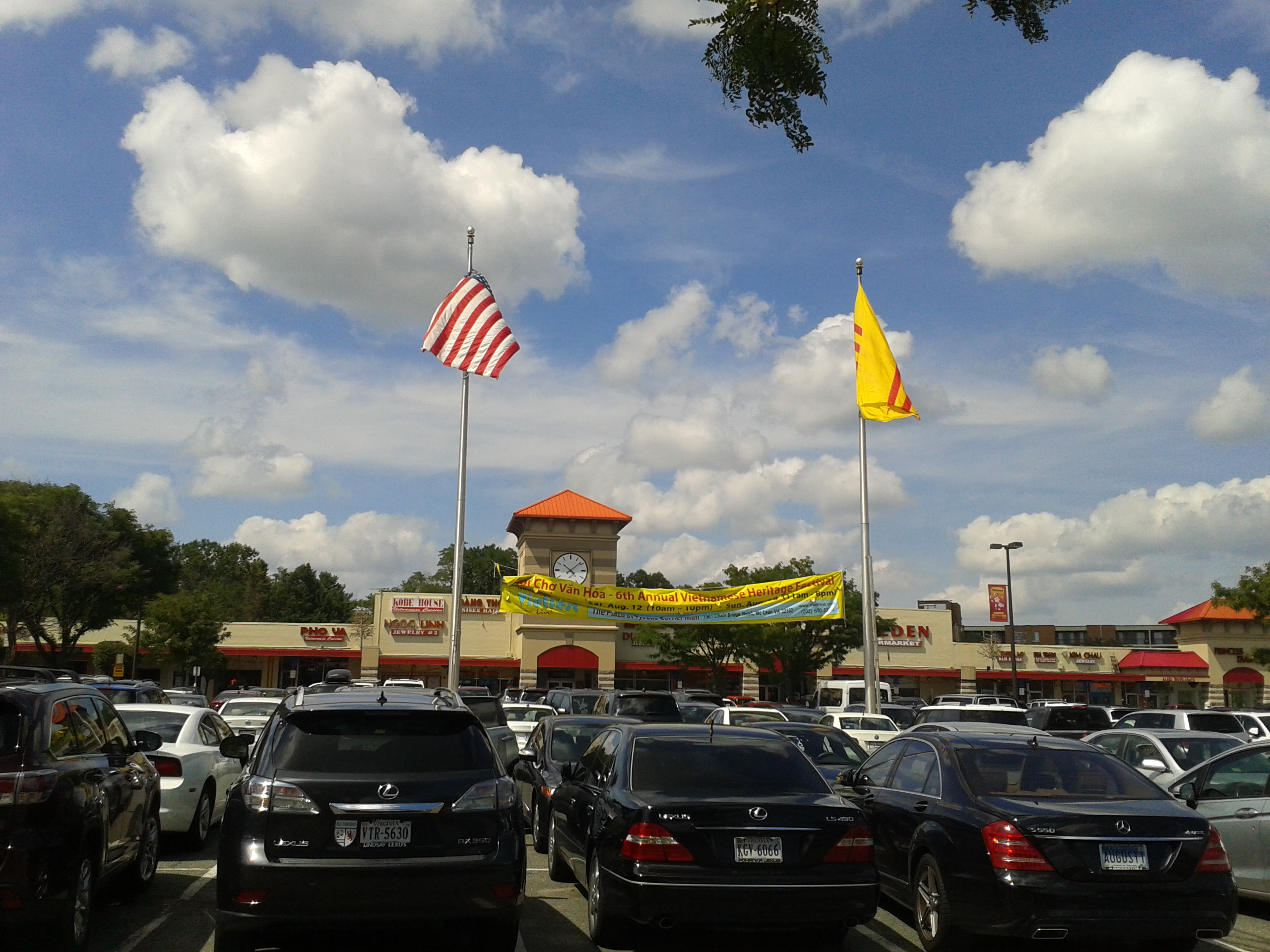
Eden Center

Eden Center is a Vietnamese American strip mall located near the crossroads of Seven Corners in the City of Falls Church, Virginia. Eden Center is the largest Vietnamese commercial center on the East Coast and is considered Falls Church's top tourist destination. The center is home to more than 120 shops, restaurants and businesses catering extensively to the Asian American, especially the Vietnamese-American, population. Eden Center has created an anchor for Vietnamese culture serving the Virginia, North Carolina, Maryland, and Pennsylvania areas, as shown by the large number of phở soup restaurants, bánh mì delicatessens, bakeries, and markets located there, as well as Vietnamese-American cultural events that are regularly held at the center.

== History ==
The center opened in 1962 as the Plaza Seven Shopping Center, with a Grand Union supermarket and a Zayre discount store serving as anchors. After the Grand Union store closed in 1984, Vietnamese merchants displaced from the "Little Saigon" area in the Clarendon neighborhood of nearby Arlington, Virginia, due to Washington Metro subway construction and redevelopment, moved into the space, as the Vietnamese-American community in Northern Virginia (and the Washington, DC, metropolitan area) grew following the Vietnam War. The mall is named after the Eden Arcade market in Ho Chi Minh City. The cluster of stores took on the Eden name, and erected an "Eden" sign. It ultimately evolved into the name for the entire center. The landlord, Capital Commercial Properties, later added a clock tower and an arch flanked by lions, inspired by the Bến Thành Market in Ho Chi Minh City, Vietnam.

== Layout ==
Most businesses are located on ground level and offer direct access to the sidewalk and parking lot, as would a conventional strip mall. About 65 more stores and restaurants are inside three enclosed malls. In the rear of the mall are additional businesses, currently including a nightclub.

The mall flies a South Vietnamese Flag, as do many Vietnamese-owned businesses in the Washington, D.C., area.

== Stores ==
Eden Center is host to a variety of business types, a few of which incorporate "Eden" in their names. Most are food-related: restaurants, supermarkets, and specialty delicatessens catering prepared foods. Restaurants range from carry-out-only places that serve stir-fry dishes and spring rolls to high-volume phở soup restaurants to sit-down restaurants with large varied menus and a formal decor. Other businesses include jewelry stores, herbal medicine shops, clothing and toy stores, and travel agents.

A 44,000-square foot Good Fortune supermarket opened in the former Ames building in November 2014.

Eden Center was featured on the January 19, 2009, episode of Anthony Bourdain: No Reservations that focused on the Washington, D.C., area, with Bourdain visited the Song Que deli.

== Events ==
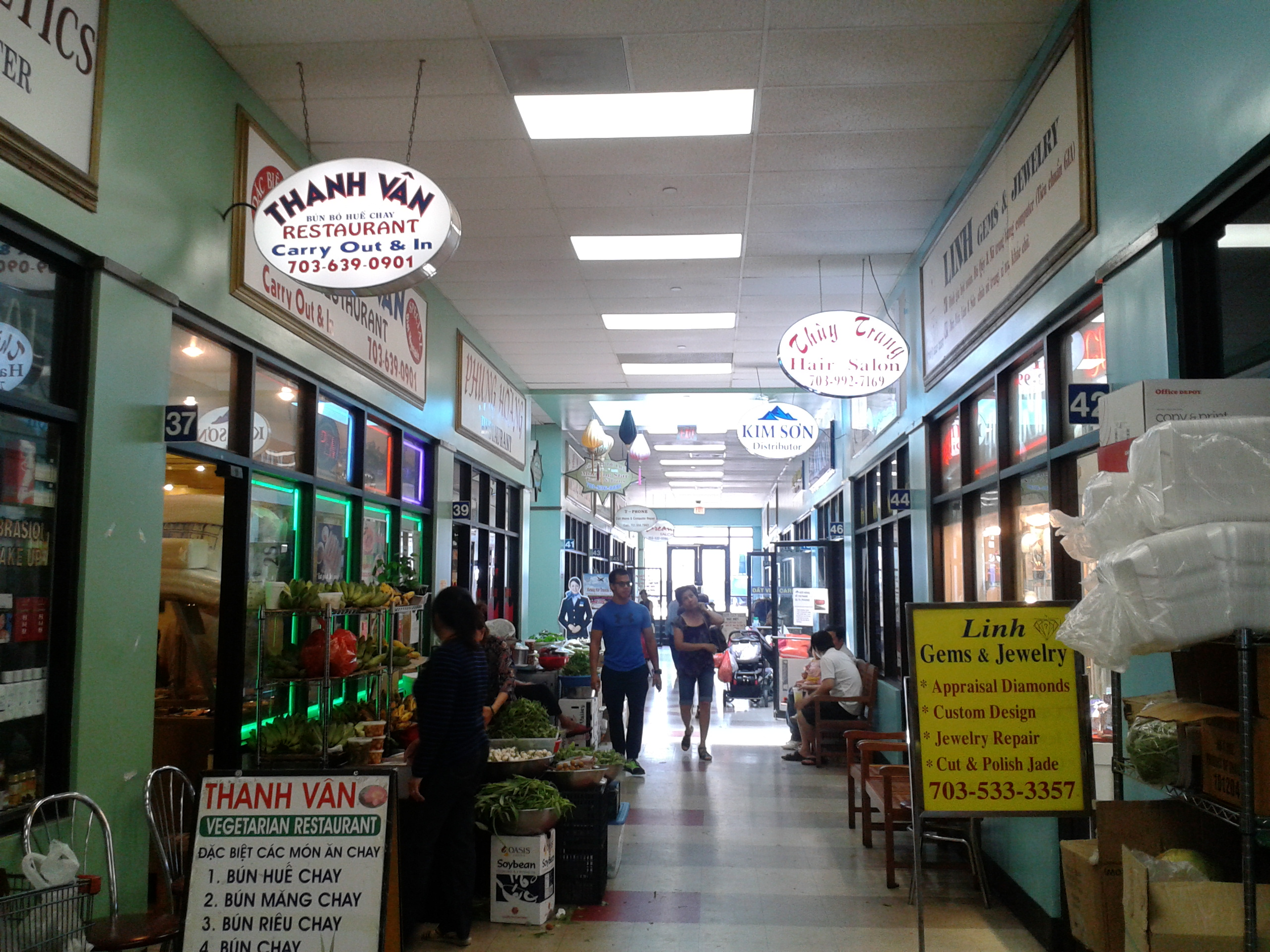
Vietnamese restaurants and shops line the interior and exterior of the Eden Center.

Eden Center hosts an annual Tết, or Vietnamese New Year festival, and an annual Moon Festival, both widely attended with a display of special food, performers, fireworks, and lion dancing.

Each September, the Eden Center plays host to the annual "Miss Vietnam DC" scholarship pageant, the preeminent contest of its kind in the Washington, D.C., area.

== Crime ==
In 1997, after a fatal shooting, the Falls Church Police Department opened a substation at Eden Center. The property landlord also began operating 48 closed-circuit monitoring cameras.

On August 11, 2011, federal agents, Virginia State Police, and local police jointly raided several businesses in Eden Center, seizing more than $1 million in cash from one business and small amounts from other businesses. Also seized were several gambling machines; and 19 people were arrested on suspicion of gambling and alcohol crimes. Police blamed the Dragon Family gang, a Vietnamese-American criminal gang that operates in Asian-American hubs across North America. No felony charges were ever filed, and ultimately, though some defendants pleaded guilty, many had their cases dismissed before trial. At least one defendant went to trial and was found not guilty of the charges. The raid ignited tensions between the Eden Center businesses and the City of Falls Church government. After a second raid five months later arrested suspects on a variety of gambling and money laundering charges, many in the community alleged racism and poor investigation by the police.

== See also ==
- Seven Corners, Virginia
- Leesburg Pike
- Little Saigon
