= Joseph R. Harris Co. =

- Industry: Retail
- Founded: 1916
- Defunct: ?
- Fate: Bankruptcy
- Headquarters: Washington, D.C.
- Key people: Joseph R. Harris, founder
- Products: Fashion apparel, shoes, accessories, and cosmetics.

Joseph R. Harris Co. was a Washington, D.C.–based chain of women's apparel stores.

== History ==
The chain was founded in 1916 in Washington, D.C. by Joseph R. Harris. By the time of its sale in 1971, to the retail conglomerate Garfinckel, Brooks Brothers, Miller & Rhoads, Inc., it had grown to nine locations in the Washington, D.C. area, and branches in Atlanta, Georgia, and Charlotte, North Carolina. The company's founder retired as board chairman that same year.

In 1978, the Minneapolis, Minnesota–based retailer Gamble-Skogmo, Inc. purchased a 20-percent share of the Garfinckel conglomerate from the Joseph R. Harris family, thereby gaining a controlling interest in it. A court suit resulted in an agreement that Gamble-Skogmo would not acquire any more stock in Garfinckel. The following year, Garfinckel sold the Joseph R. Harris Co., then renamed Harris & Friends, to the Petrie Stores Corp. of Cleveland, Ohio. At the time, Harris had 26 stores in Maryland, Virginia, North Carolina, Pennsylvania, Georgia, and the District of Columbia.

== Flagship store ==
The original location was at 1212 F Street, NW, in the downtown core shopping district of Washington, D.C. In 1929, they moved to 1224 F Street, NW. The chains final flagship store opened in 1965, and was located at 1336 F Street, NW; a 14,000-square-foot (1,300 m^{2}) store located in space formerly occupied by Capitol Theater in the National Press Building. The site is now occupied by The Shops at National Place, which became defunct in 2005-2008.
