= Raleigh Haberdasher =

Former department store chain

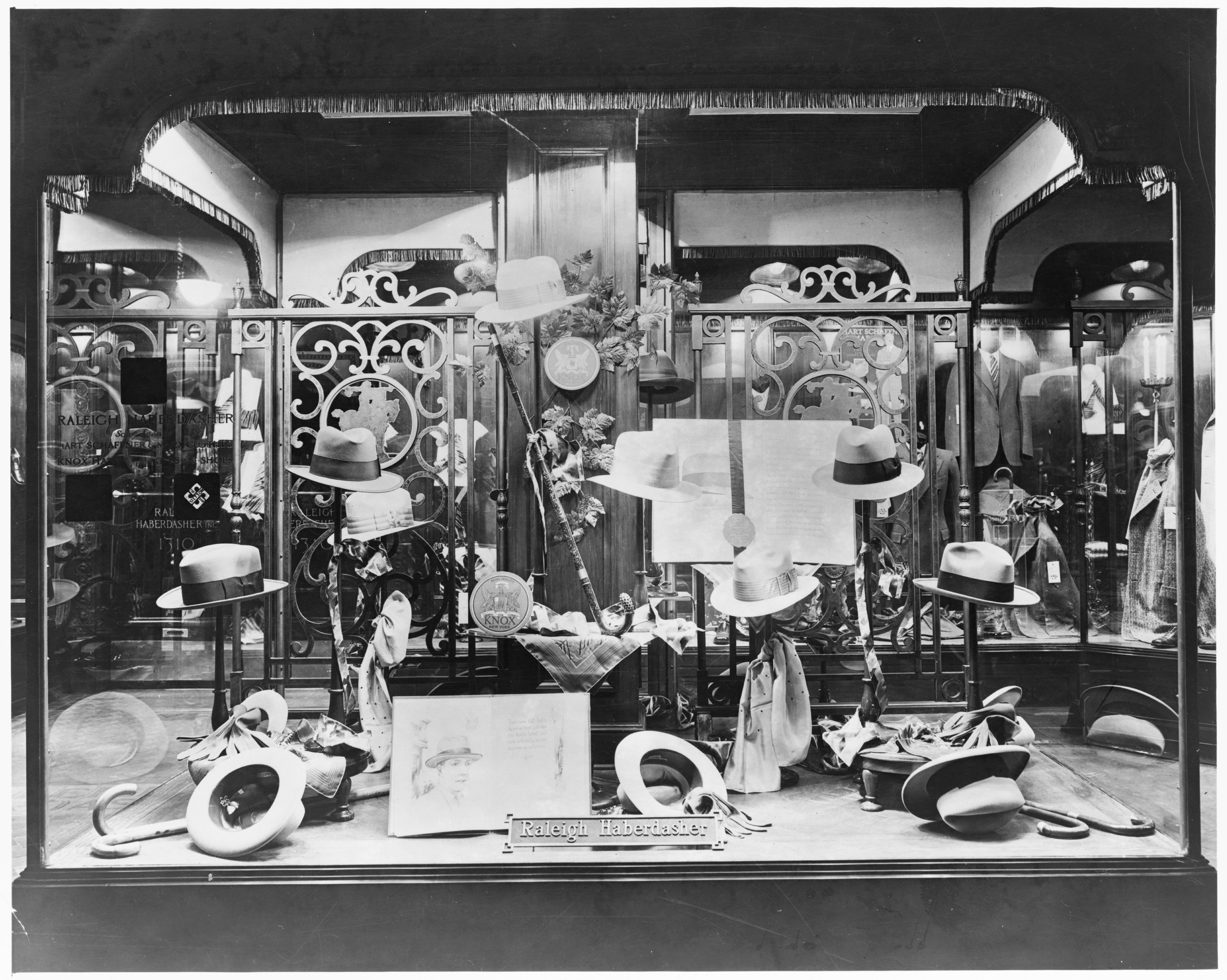
- Industry: Retail
- Founded: 1911
- Defunct: 1992
- Fate: Liquidation
- Headquarters: Washington, D.C.
- Key people: Clarence W. Grosner, founder
- Products: Fashion apparel, shoes, and accessories
- Parent: Hartmarx

Raleigh Haberdasher, more commonly called Raleigh's, was a high end, local men's and women's apparel store based in Washington, D.C.

== History ==
The first store opened on February 16, 1911, at 1109 Pennsylvania Ave., NW, in the Raleigh Hotel. Mr. Clarence Grosner was the first store operator.

Men who give thought to care and taste in their dress will be interested to hear of the opening today of The Raleigh Haberdasher at 1109 Pennsylvania avenue. Mr. Clarence W. Grosner, who for many years has been well known in Washington as a popular caterer to the sartorial wants of man, will be in charge of this new emporium, which is an assurance that everything will be strictly up-to-date and first class. The place has been thoroughly remodeled and the fixtures are of the latest and most attractive design. The aim of the Raleigh Haberdasher will be to sell the very newest and best in exclusive furnishings and hats for men at the lowest prices.

In 1952, Sidney Lansburgh and his family purchased the company from the estate of Clarence Grosner. He would remain President and Chief Executive Officer of the Raleigh Stores Corp. until his death in 1983. Raleigh's remained an independent, family owned corporation until 1984, when it was acquired by an investor group headed by New York retail entrepreneur Neal J. Fox. In 1987, Fox purchased the Garfinckel's department store chain for $95 million (~$224 million in 2024) in a leveraged buyout. The following year, Fox was ousted by investors and Raleigh's was acquired by Hartmarx. In September 1992, after Hartmarx sold Raleigh's along with other retail stores to the investors group HSSA Group Ltd., they announced the decision to close the chain six days after purchasing it. The chain closed in December 1992.

== Flagship store ==
In 1923 the downtown store moved to 1310 F Street, NW. That store would remain the flagship store and headquarters until 1971, and remain open until January 1980. It was demolished and replaced by The Shops at National Place.

In 1971, the company moved its flagship store to 1133 Connecticut Ave., NW, in a location formerly occupied by Erlebacher's. In 1986, that store was sold for $7.5 million and the store moved to a "temporary location" across the street 1130 Connecticut Ave., NW. It would return to its former flagship for its liquidation sale in late 1992.
