= De Pinna =

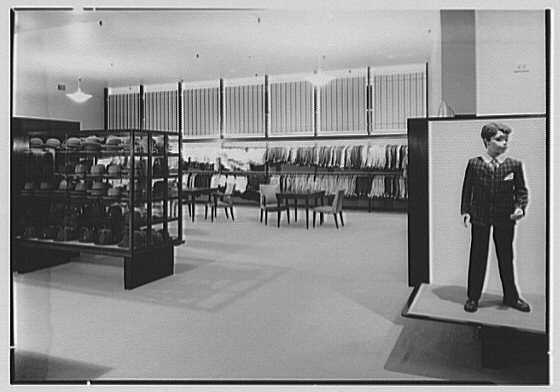
- The interior of the 5th & 52nd Street flagship in 1951.
- Industry: Retail
- Founded: 1885
- Defunct: 1969
- Fate: Closure
- Headquarters: New York City
- Key people: Alfred De Pinna, founder
- Products: Fashion apparel, shoes, accessories, and cosmetics.
- Parent: Garfinckel, Brooks Brothers, Miller & Rhoads, Inc.

De Pinna was a high-end clothier for men and women founded in New York City in 1885, by Alfred De Pinna (1831–1915), a Sephardic Jew born in England. They also sold menswear-inspired clothing for women that was finely tailored. The flagship store was located at 642-50 Fifth Avenue and 52nd Street. Alfred De Pinna retired from the company in 1912, and turned operations over to his son, Leo S., who ran the store until his retirement in 1939. In 1950, De Pinna was bought by the Washington, D.C.–based store, Julius Garfinckel & Co. Branch locations operated at Eastchester, New York and Sunrise Center at Fort Lauderdale, Florida. In 1969, the retail conglomerate Garfinckel, Brooks Brothers, Miller & Rhoads, Inc. closed the unprofitable De Pinna chain.
