= Fashion Park Clothes =

Manufacturer of men's tailored suits and apparel

Fashion Park Clothes was a Rochester, New York-based manufacturer of men's tailored suits and apparel. They were located at 432 Portland Ave in Rochester, NY. They operated from the 1910s into the 1960s. In 1928, another Rochester-based clothing manufacturer, Stein-Bloch & Co., merged with Fashion Park.

In the Washington, D.C. market, from 1919 to 1925, Fashion Park products were retailed by "The Young Men's Shop," 1319-1321 F Street, NW, and from 1926 to 1956, by "The Mode," located at 11th and F Streets, NW, and 3331 Connecticut Ave, NW.
