= Seven Corners, Virginia =

- Census-designated place (CDP)
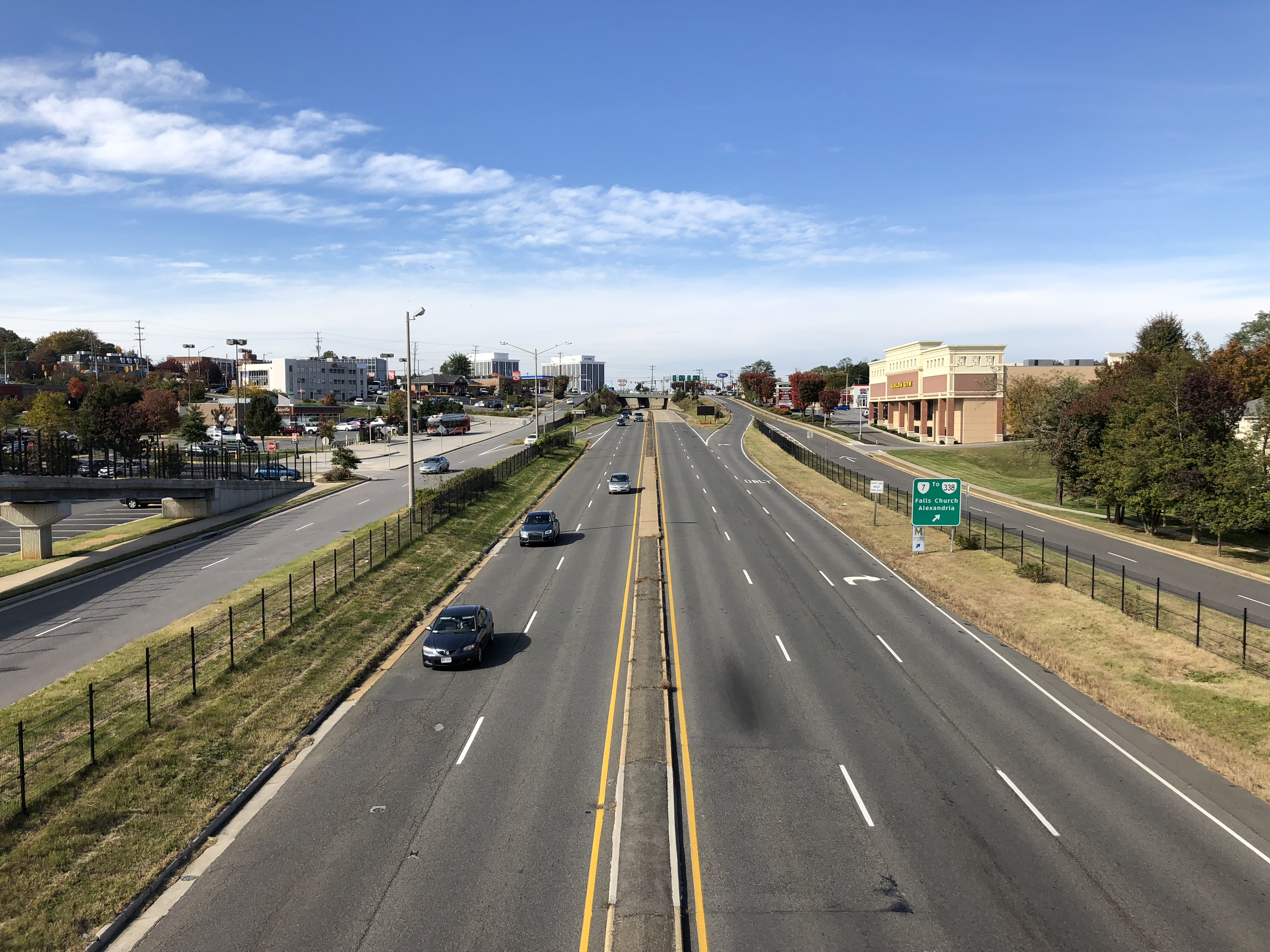
- View west along Arlington Boulevard in Seven Corners

- Location of Seven Corners in Fairfax County, Virginia

- Location within Northern Virginia Location within Virginia Location within the United States
- Coordinates: 38°51′55″N 77°8′40″W
- Country: United States
- State: Virginia
- County: Fairfax

Area
  - Total: 0.69 sq mi (1.8 km^{2})
  - Land: 0.69 sq mi (1.8 km^{2})
  - Water: 0 sq mi (0.0 km^{2})
- Elevation: 384 ft (117 m)

Population (2020)
  - Total: 9,131
  - Density: 13,000/sq mi (5,100/km^{2})
- Time zone: UTC−5 (Eastern (EST))
  - Summer (DST): UTC−4 (EDT)
- ZIP code: 22044
- Area codes: 571, 703
- FIPS code: 51-71216
- GNIS feature ID: 1493537

Seven Corners is a commercial center and census-designated place (CDP) in Fairfax County, Virginia, United States. As of the 2020 census, Seven Corners had a population of 9,131. Seven Corners has a "Falls Church" mailing address but is not within Falls Church's city limits. The area got its name from the intersection of State Route 7 (Leesburg Pike and East Broad Street), U.S. Route 50 (Arlington Boulevard), State Route 613 (Sleepy Hollow Road), State Route 338 (Hillwood Avenue) and Wilson Boulevard (also part of State Route 613). The junction of these four roads once created seven corners.

== Geography ==
According to the United States Census Bureau, the CDP has a total area of 0.7 square miles (1.8 km^{2}), all land. The Upper Long Branch of Four Mile Run passes through the northernmost low point of the CDP, adjacent Brook Drive, and that adjacent land is registered with Fairfax County Park authority for development, under a phased plan.

The area is built on Munson's Hill, and overlooks adjacent Upton's Hill. The views to the south and west are unbroken and offer scenic vistas in the directions of Annandale and Fairfax City.

== History ==
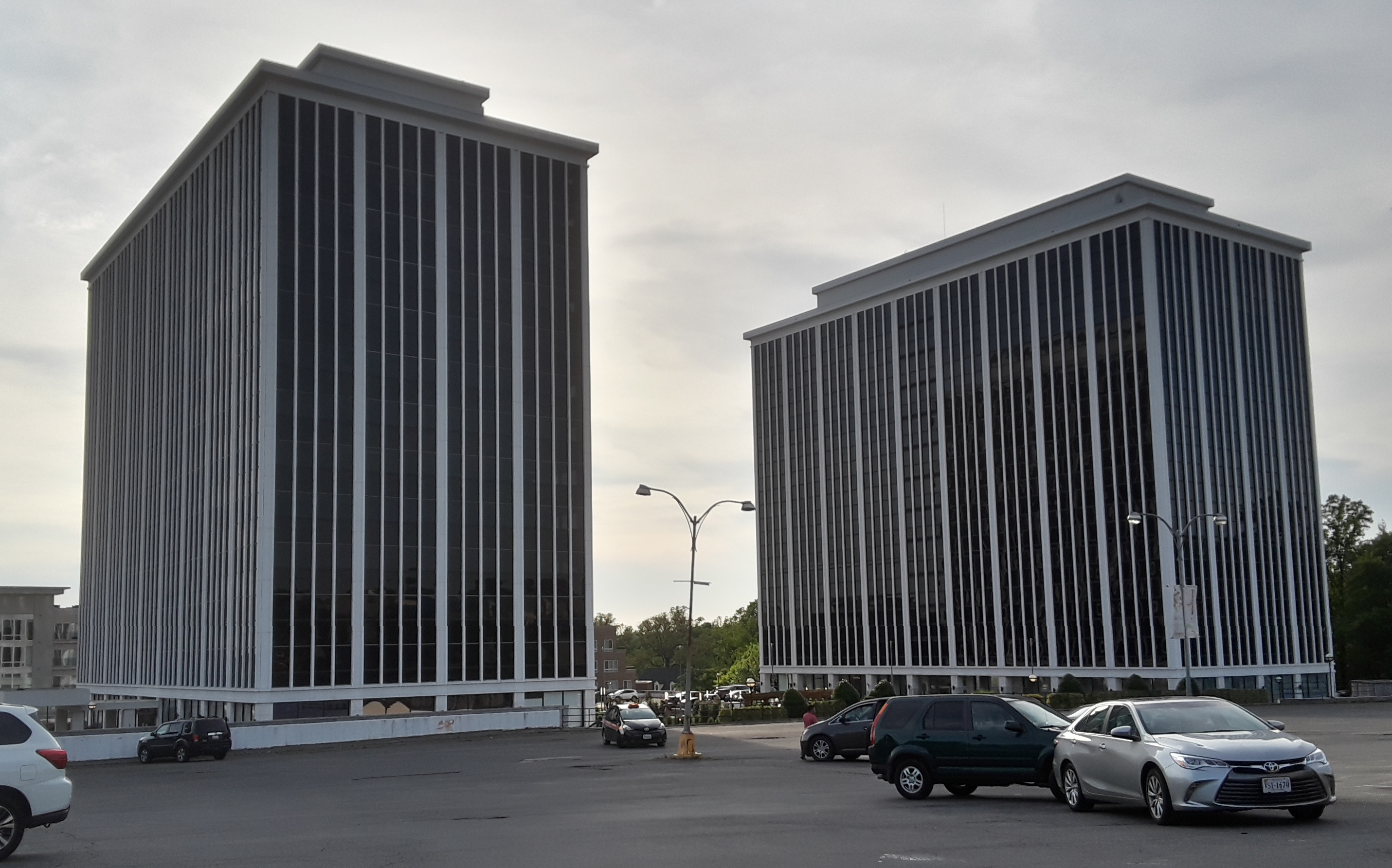
Office towers in Seven Corners, major landmarks in the area

Seven Corners was known as Fort Buffalo from the American Civil War until the 1950s. The area took its name from a fortification constructed in October 1862 by men of the 21st New York Infantry. Fort Buffalo stood on the southern side of the Leesburg Pike, at its current intersection with Sleepy Hollow Road. The story of the fort is described in a local history of the Civil War entitled A Virginia Village Goes to War--Falls Church During the Civil War. The fort was built at that location to take advantage of the excellent views to the east and south—the direction from which Confederate Army troops were thought to possibly come.

After the war the massive fortification of Fort Buffalo was dismantled but other earthworks remained and were easily visible through the 1930s.

The change of place name in the 1950s came about due to the construction of Lee Memorial Boulevard, now known as Arlington Boulevard (U.S. Route 50). The construction of Route 50 caused the formation of a seven cornered intersection—or did until the mouth of Wilson Boulevard was rerouted slightly to avoid all those roadways converging on a single point.

With the advent of Route 50 the area quickly developed into an important commercial center with the opening in 1956 of Seven Corners Shopping Center, one of the first malls in the Washington region. The original center featured an iconic sign combined with a modernistic entry arch; this was later removed. The original Route 50, envisioned and built as a landscaped parkway linking Washington, D.C., with the Shenandoah Valley, has since evolved into a commercial corridor and its function as a link to the valley has been assumed by Interstate 66.

== Demographics ==
Historical population
| Census | Pop. | Note | %± |
|---|---|---|---|
| 1970 | 5,590 | | — |
| 1980 | 6,058 | | 8.4% |
| 1990 | 7,280 | | 20.2% |
| 2000 | 8,701 | | 19.5% |
| 2010 | 9,255 | | 6.4% |
| 2020 | 9,131 | | −1.3% |

=== 2020 census ===
Seven Corners CDP, Virginia – Racial and ethnic composition Note: the US Census treats Hispanic/Latino as an ethnic category. This table excludes Latinos from the racial categories and assigns them to a separate category. Hispanics/Latinos may be of any race.
| Race / Ethnicity (NH = Non-Hispanic) | Pop 2000 | Pop 2010 | Pop 2020 | % 2000 | % 2010 | % 2020 |
|---|---|---|---|---|---|---|
| White alone (NH) | 2,468 | 2,371 | 2,029 | 28.36% | 25.62% | 22.22% |
| Black or African American alone (NH) | 558 | 605 | 744 | 6.41% | 6.54% | 8.15% |
| Native American or Alaska Native alone (NH) | 11 | 23 | 6 | 0.13% | 0.25% | 0.07% |
| Asian alone (NH) | 1,766 | 1,822 | 1,796 | 20.30% | 19.69% | 19.67% |
| Native Hawaiian or Pacific Islander alone (NH) | 5 | 8 | 5 | 0.06% | 0.09% | 0.05% |
| Other race alone (NH) | 31 | 62 | 59 | 0.36% | 0.67% | 0.65% |
| Mixed race or Multiracial (NH) | 329 | 268 | 285 | 3.78% | 2.90% | 3.12% |
| Hispanic or Latino (any race) | 3,533 | 4,096 | 4,207 | 40.60% | 44.26% | 46.07% |
| Total | 8,701 | 9,255 | 9,131 | 100.00% | 100.00% | 100.00% |

=== 2000 census ===
As of the census of 2000, there were 8,701 people, 3,304 households, and 1,893 families residing in the CDP. The population density was 12,773.2 inhabitants per square mile (4,931.8/km^{2}). There were 3,378 housing units at an average density of 4,959.0 per square mile (1,914.7/km^{2}). The racial makeup of the CDP was 49.10% White, 6.68% African American, 0.28% Native American, 20.54% Asian, 0.07% Pacific Islander, 16.17% from other races, and 7.17% from two or more races. Hispanic or Latino of any race were 40.60% of the population.

There were 3,304 households, out of which 28.8% had children under the age of 18 living with them, 39.9% were married couples living together, 10.8% had a female householder with no husband present, and 42.7% were non-families. 33.7% of all households were made up of individuals, and 5.5% had someone living alone who was 65 years of age or older. The average household size was 2.62 and the average family size was 3.30.

In the CDP, the population was spread out, with 21.2% under the age of 18, 11.5% from 18 to 24, 41.6% from 25 to 44, 19.5% from 45 to 64, and 6.2% who were 65 years of age or older. The median age was 32 years. For every 100 females, there were 108.2 males. For every 100 females age 18 and over, there were 108.9 males.

The median income for a household in the CDP was $44,579, and the median income for a family was $43,211. Males had a median income of $31,444 versus $30,743 for females. The per capita income for the CDP was $20,475. About 15.9% of families and 18.7% of the population were below the poverty line, including 27.3% of those under age 18 and 17.6% of those age 65 or over.

== Notable locations ==
The Seven Corners Shopping Center is located in the Seven Corners CDP. The Eden Center Vietnamese-American strip mall is located across Wilson Boulevard from the Seven Corners Shopping Center, just outside the Seven Corners CDP in Falls Church.

The Dar Al-Hijrah mosque is in Seven Corners.

The parking lot of a Home Depot hardware store in the Seven Corners Shopping Center was the scene of one of the shootings in the 2002 D.C. sniper attacks; Linda Franklin was slain while she returned to her car in the crowded parking lot.

== Management of traffic at the intersection ==
The namesake "seven" corners has long since disappeared, having been replaced by somewhat more motorist-friendly intersections which well exceed the former seven. Motorists bound in any direction are subject to one or more stoplight signals. There is a pedestrian bridge over US 50. The roads themselves are not pedestrian-friendly. The County has a traffic management and commercial development plan in place, work has begun, and the land between Leesburg Pike and Wilson Boulevard adjacent Patrick Henry Drive is now largely owned by the County.

The traffic is managed as follows from the following roads:

- US Route 50 (US 50) is a highway that runs east–west along Arlington Boulevard in the area. US 50 has a series of frontage roads that connect to the other roadways in the intersection. Through traffic can continue on the highway itself unimpeded by the local traffic in the intersection.
- State Road 7 (SR 7) is a four- to six-lane roadway, separated by a median following East Broad Street to the northwest or Leesburg Pike to the southeast of the intersection. Motorists may access any of the other roads.
- State Road 338 (SR 338) terminates in the intersection from the northwest. Traffic proceeding southeast defaults onto SR 7 east.
- Sleepy Hollow Road terminates with northbound traffic defaulting to follow SR 7 to the southeast. Secondary State Route 613 follows Sleepy Hollow to the south and continues along Wilson Boulevard to the northeast.
- Wilson Boulevard terminates at the intersection from the northeast. Southbound traffic defaults to follow the US 50 frontage road northwesterly which connects to SR 7 westbound. From this frontage road, traffic may access all other directions of the other roads in the intersection.
