= Lafayette Square, Washington, D.C. =

Urban park and square in Washington, D.C., U.S.

Lafayette Square
- Aerial view: Lafayette Square is the green space to the left of Pennsylvania Avenue (center). The White House grounds are to the right
- Interactive map of Lafayette Square
- Coordinates: 38°53′58.3″N 77°02′11.6″W
- Area: 7 acres (2.8 ha)

Lafayette Square is a seven-acre (28,327 m^{2}) public park located within President's Park in Washington, D.C., directly north of the White House on H Street, bounded by Jackson Place on the west, Madison Place on the east and Pennsylvania Avenue on the south. It is named for the general, the Marquis de Lafayette, a French aristocrat, and hero of the American Revolutionary War (1775–1783).

The square includes several statues of revolutionary heroes from Europe, including Lafayette. At its center is a famous statue of early 19th century U.S. president and general Andrew Jackson on horseback with both of the horse's front hooves raised.

In 1970, Lafayette Square and the surrounding structures were designated the Lafayette Square Historic District.

== History ==
=== Initial plans ===
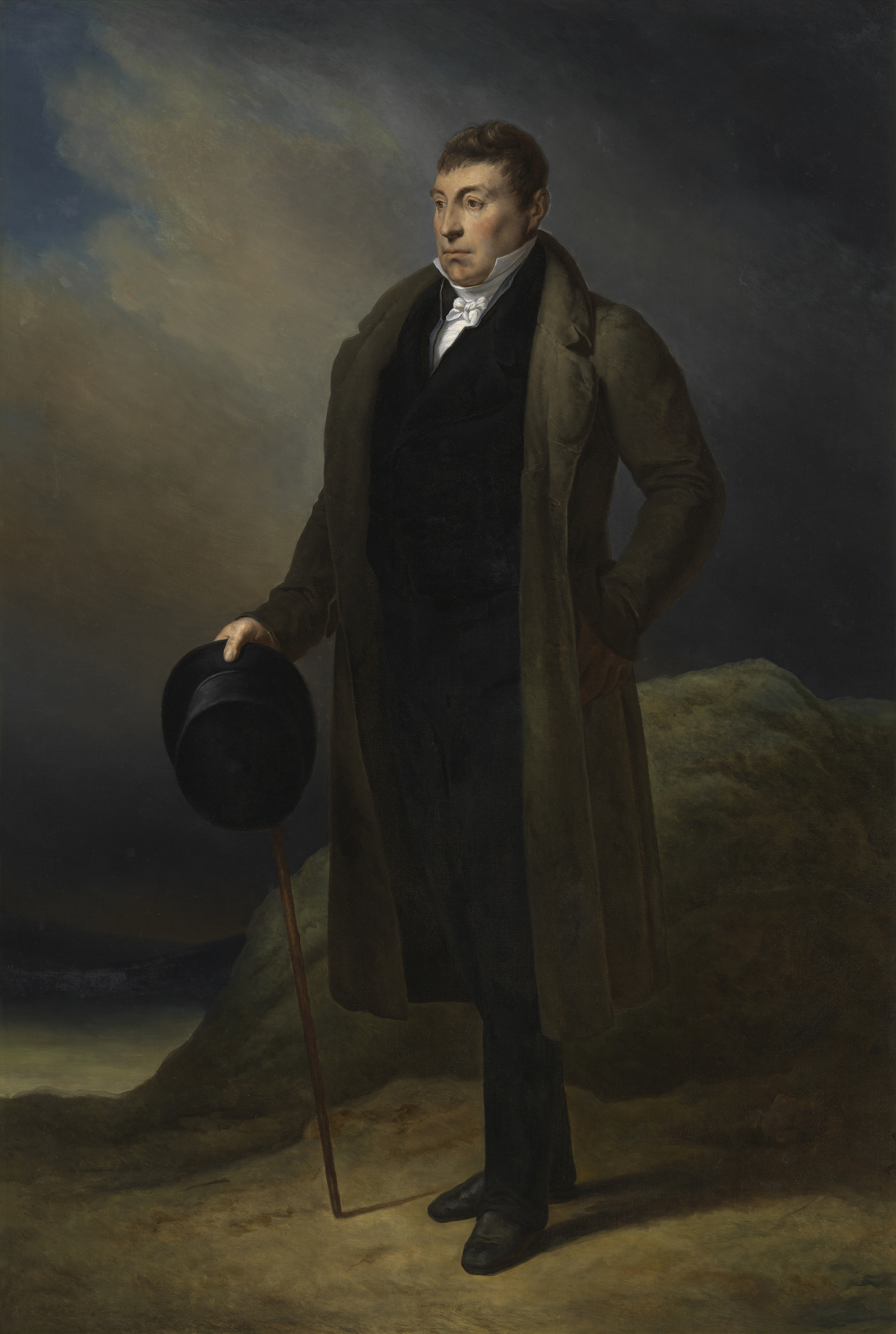
An 1824 portrait of Lafayette by Ary Scheffer, now housed in the U.S. House of Representatives

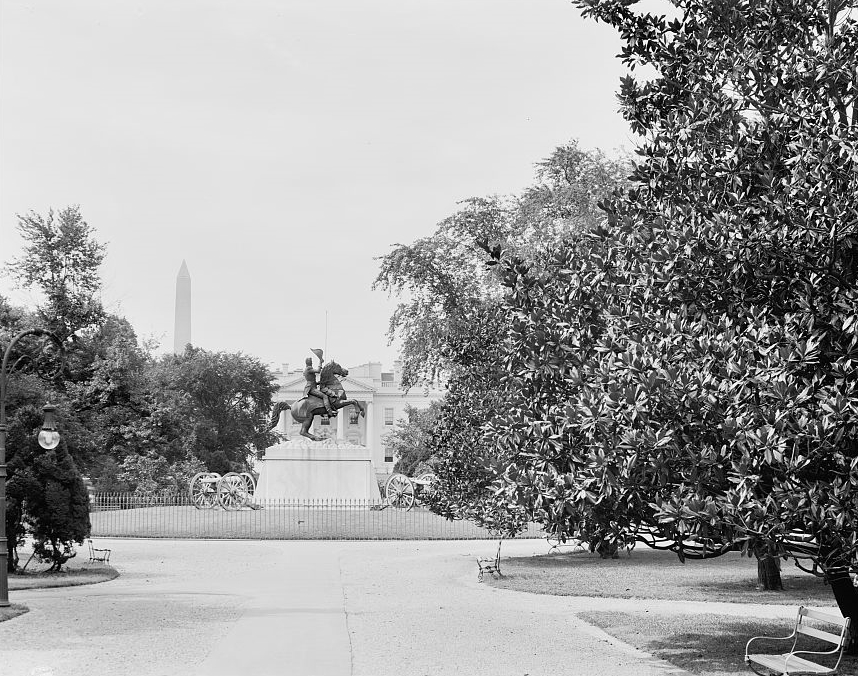
The Andrew Jackson statue of Andrew Jackson by Clark Mills, pictured c. 1900, erected in Lafayette Park in 1853

Planned by Pierre L'Enfant as part of the pleasure grounds surrounding the Executive Mansion, the square is part of President's Park, which is the larger National Park Service unit that also includes the White House grounds, The Ellipse, the Eisenhower Executive Office Building and grounds and the Treasury Building and grounds. In 1804, President Thomas Jefferson had Pennsylvania Avenue cut through the park and separated what would become Lafayette Square from the White House grounds. In 1824, that north side square including the park was renamed in honor of the Marquis de Lafayette, the French general whose involvement was indispensable in securing victory in the American Revolutionary War.

Named in honor of the naval war hero Commodore Steven Decatur, the Decatur House borders Lafayette Square. Used for slave trading, the house remains as one of few surviving examples of an urban slave market.

The land on what is now Lafayette Square was formerly used at various times as "a racetrack, a graveyard, a zoo, a slave market, an encampment for soldiers during the War of 1812, and the site of many political protests and celebrations." In the early and mid-19th century, the buildings around the square included the homes of Washington's most prominent residents, including William Wilson Corcoran, Martin van Buren, Henry Clay, Dolley Madison, John Hay, and Henry Adams.

=== 19th century ===
In 1851, Andrew Jackson Downing was commissioned by President Millard Fillmore to landscape Lafayette Square in the picturesque style. On February 27, 1859, US Representative Daniel Sickles killed Philip Barton Key II in Lafayette Square. Key had come to the park for an affair with Sickles's wife, only to be discovered and killed by Sickles.

=== 20th century ===
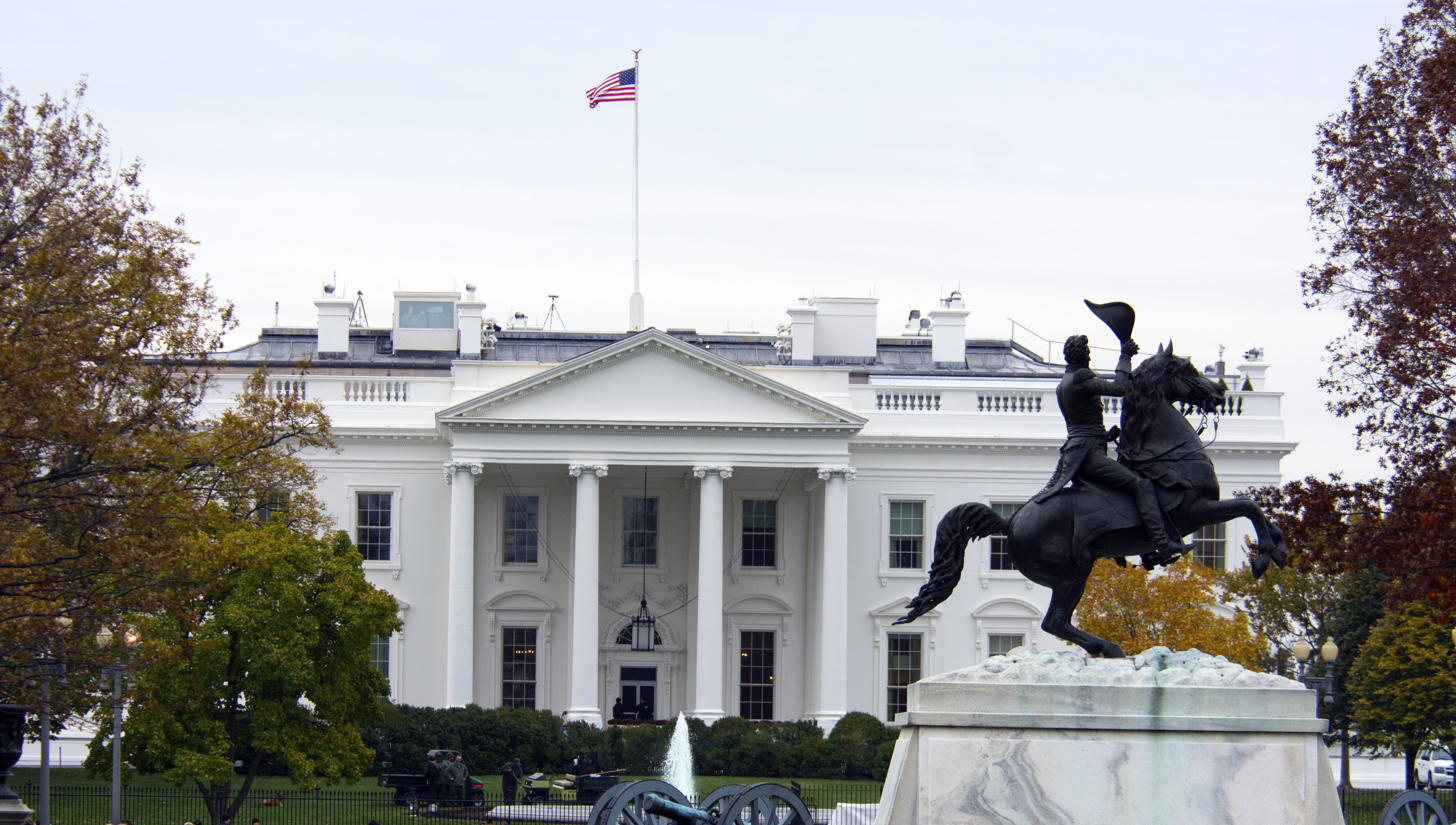
Clark Mills' equestrian statue of President Andrew Jackson, erected in 1853

In the 20th century, the area around the square became less residential, with buildings increasingly occupied by offices and professional groups, especially in the 1920s, and the construction of the Treasury Annex. The last resident, Mary Chase Morris of the O'Toole House (730 Jackson Place), died during the Great Depression era, and her former home became an office building.

The current layout of the park dates from the 1930s. The park has five large statues. In the center stands Clark Mills' equestrian statue of President Andrew Jackson, erected in 1853; it is the first bronze statue cast in the United States. In the four corners are statues of foreign Revolutionary War heroes:

- Major General Marquis Gilbert de Lafayette (depicting the Marquis de Lafayette, of France, by sculptors Alexandre Falguière and Antonin Mercié, installed 1891);
- Major General Comte Jean de Rochambeau (depicting the comte de Rochambeau, of France, by sculptor Fernand Hamar, dedicated 1902);
- Brigadier General Thaddeus Kosciuszko (depicting Tadeusz Kościuszko, of Poland, by sculptor Antoni Popiel, dedicated 1910);
- Major General Friedrich Wilhelm von Steuben (depicting the Baron von Steuben, of Prussia, by sculptor Albert Jaegers, dedicated 1910).

Lafayette Square was a popular cruising spot for gay men until the 1950s Lavender scare.

In the 1960s, Lafayette Square became more noted for its use as a protest location. Protests related to nuclear weapons, Israel, and the Vietnam War were held there.

In the 1970s, the park was overrun with a large Eastern gray squirrel population, possibly "the highest density of squirrels ever recorded in scientific literature," which eventually destroyed many trees and flowers in the park. The squirrels' large numbers were sustained because the public overfed the squirrels and also because nestboxes had once been installed and maintained by the National Park Service. In 1985 and 1987, the issue was solved by a project in which the nest boxes were removed and many squirrels were captured and relocated away from Lafayette Square, to Fort Dupont Park and elsewhere.

In 1989, Drug Enforcement Administration agents arranged a crack cocaine purchase in Lafayette Park prior to US President George H. W. Bush's delivery of a national address that was part of his ongoing effort against drug abuse.

Thomas and Concepcion Picciotto are founders of the White House Peace Vigil, which is the longest running anti-nuclear peace vigil in U.S. history, at Lafayette Square.

=== 21st century ===
On June 1, 2020, amid mass protests in Washington, DC and nationally, which followed the murder of George Floyd in Minneapolis, Lafayette Square and surrounding city streets were forcefully evicted of protesters, reporters, and clergy by police in riot gear using tear gas and clubbing them with batons. A day after the incident, a DOJ official said that U.S. Attorney General William Barr had personally ordered the park and surrounding areas to be cleared which resulted in a display of police aggression against a largely peaceful crowd.

The act, carried out by U.S. Park Police, Arlington County police, Federal Bureau of Prisons officers, and Secret Service officers, was condemned by critics as a violation of the First Amendment right to freedom of assembly. Bureau of Prison officials fired pepper spray munitions, contrary to the instructions of Park Police leadership. Although the D.C. Metropolitan Police was not involved in the initial advance of police against the crowd, MPD officers fired tear gas at demonstrators as they moved away from the park toward 17th Street.

A report by the U.S. Department of Interior Office of Inspector General (OIG), released in June 2021, was limited to examining the Park Police under its jurisdiction. It concluded that the Park Police action was part of a plan to install "antiscale fencing" and that these plans were made before Barr arrived on the scene at 6:10 p.m. and before Trump walked to the church. Park Police commanders could not agree on who gave the order to deploy or explain why radio transmissions were not recorded.

The OIG report found that, contrary to the Park Police operational plan, the Secret Service began their operation at 6:16 p.m., soon after Barr arrived and a full seven minutes before any dispersal order was given by the Park Police. The Secret Service apologized for this incident but the OIG for the Department of the Interior and the OIG for the Department of Homeland Security declined to investigate their actions. Similarly, the Park Police also deployed prior to completing dispersal orders. Park Police did not explain why the operation began before a widely announced curfew as requested by DC Police.

The OIG report further stated that the Park Police's orders to disperse were not heard by all of the crowd and were generally ineffective. The OIG report stated that the evidence obtained by the OIG concerning Park Police "did not support a finding" that Trump's visit was the reason why the park was cleared. The OIG report concluded that the decision to clear the park was lawful and consistent with Interior's policy, but made no conclusions on whether the decision to clear the park was a good decision, nor did the OIG report make any conclusions about whether the police use of force was appropriate.

The OIG report focused on the role of Park Police (which is part of the Interior Department), and not on the role of other agencies, such as the Secret Service, which is part of the Homeland Security Department. Interior OIG investigators did not interview Secret Service or White House personnel. As a result, the OIG report stated that OIG "cannot assess whether" Barr's visit to the park or any planned movement by Trump "influenced the Secret Service's actions, including its early deployment on to H Street." In 2020, Joseph V. Cuffari, the DHS Inspector General, blocked recommendations from his staff to conduct an investigation into the Secret Service's actions in the clearing of Lafayette Square.

On June 22, 2020, demonstrators attempted to tear down the statue of Andrew Jackson at the center of the square. Following this incident, Lafayette Square was closed to the public. It was reopened on May 10, 2021.

== Cruising for gay sex ==
Lafayette Square was a popular place for men cruising for gay sex in Washington, D.C. until the 1950s Lavender scare. In 1892, 18 men (of whom the majority were African-American) were arrested for engaging in oral sex in the square. The 1920s diaries of Jeb Alexander document his cruising in the square. After meeting he and his partner would walk to the secluded grounds of the Lincoln Memorial, or Potomac Park and have oral or anal sex. Alexander frequently rejected the advances of Henry Gerber, who later founded the Society for Human Rights, the first gay rights organisation in the United States. Alexander nicknamed three benches on the square the "Wishing Bench", the "Magnolia Bench" and the "Nighthawk's Bench". He would sit on the benches for hours waiting for men to approach him before he was told that the best way to meet people was to take tours of the park.

== Statues ==
The square is home to statues of five prominent individuals. Each of the four statues located in each corner of the square was created in honor of a foreigner who played an important role in the American Revolutionary War. The statue located at the center is to U.S. President Andrew Jackson.

Statues to foreigners who played important roles during the American Revolutionary War

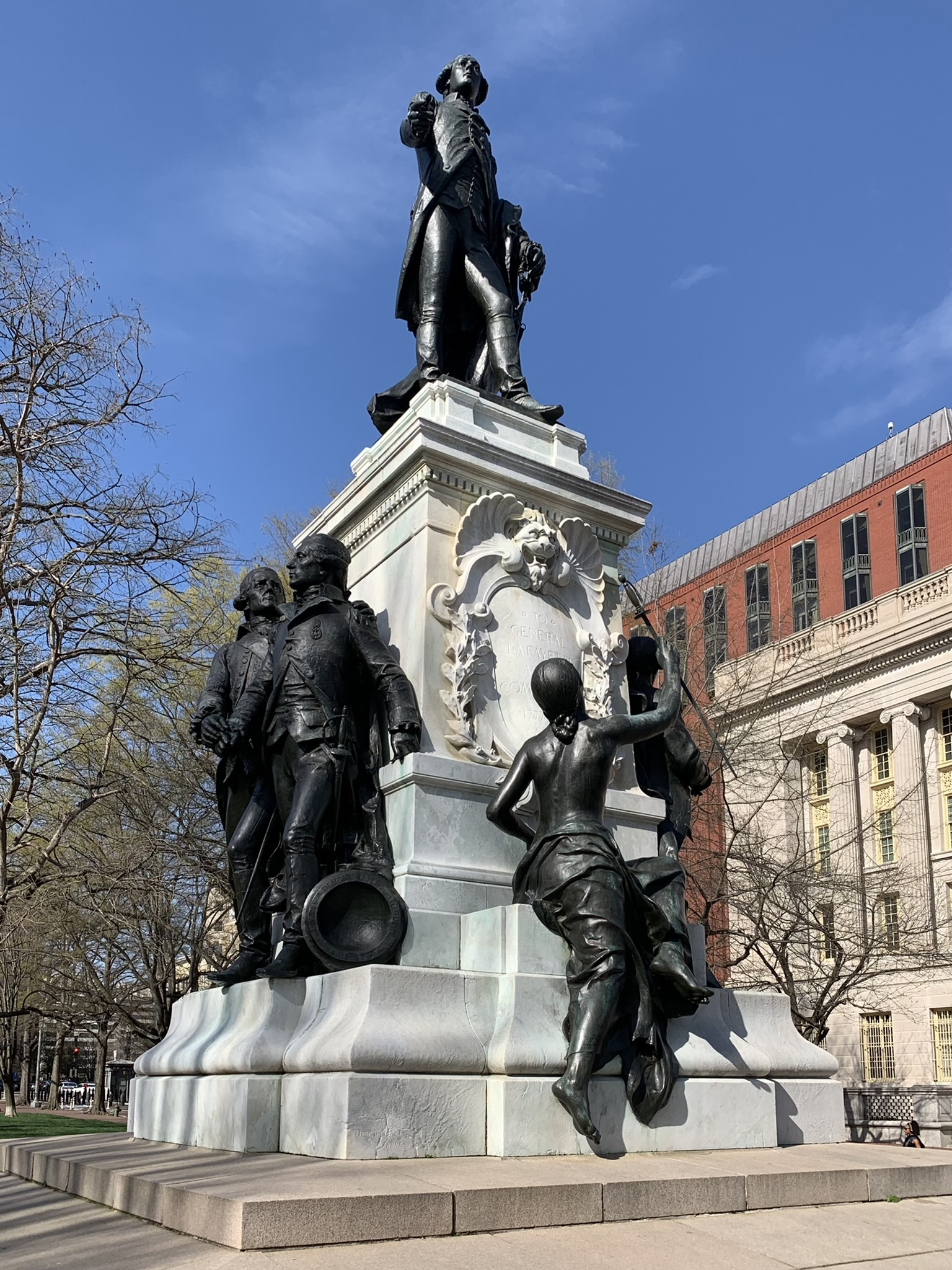
Statue of the Marquis de Lafayette

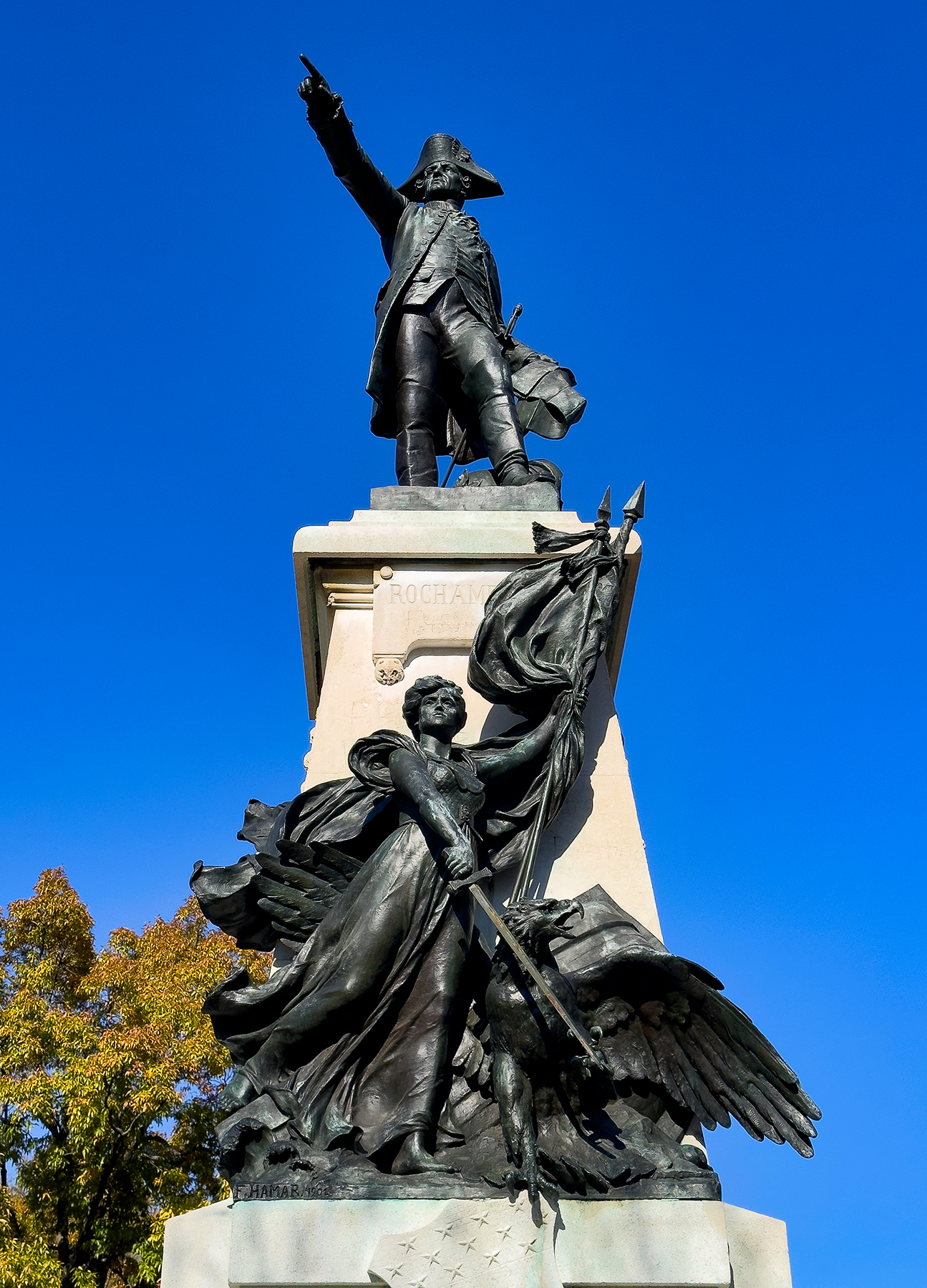
Statue of the Comte de Rochambeau

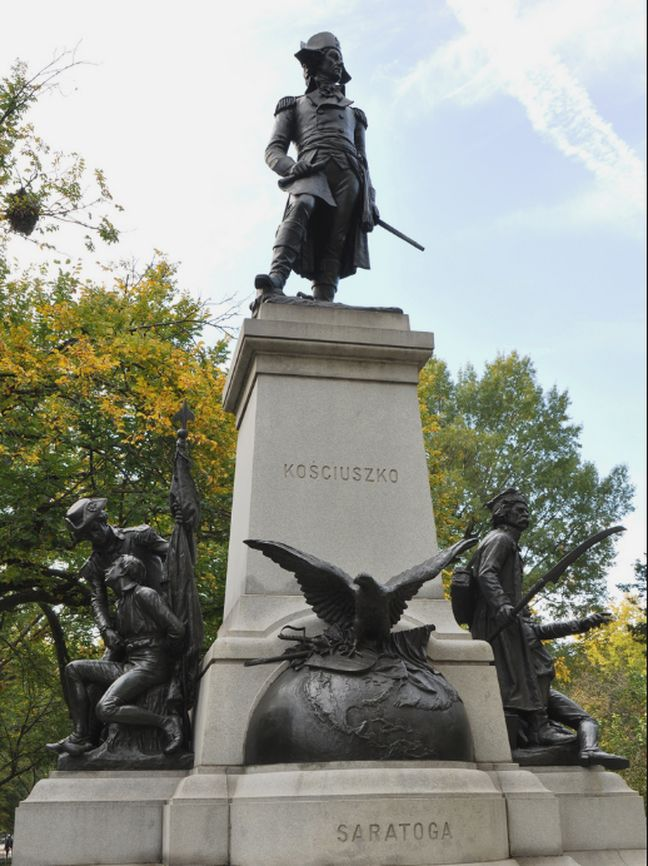
Statue of Tadeusz Kościuszko

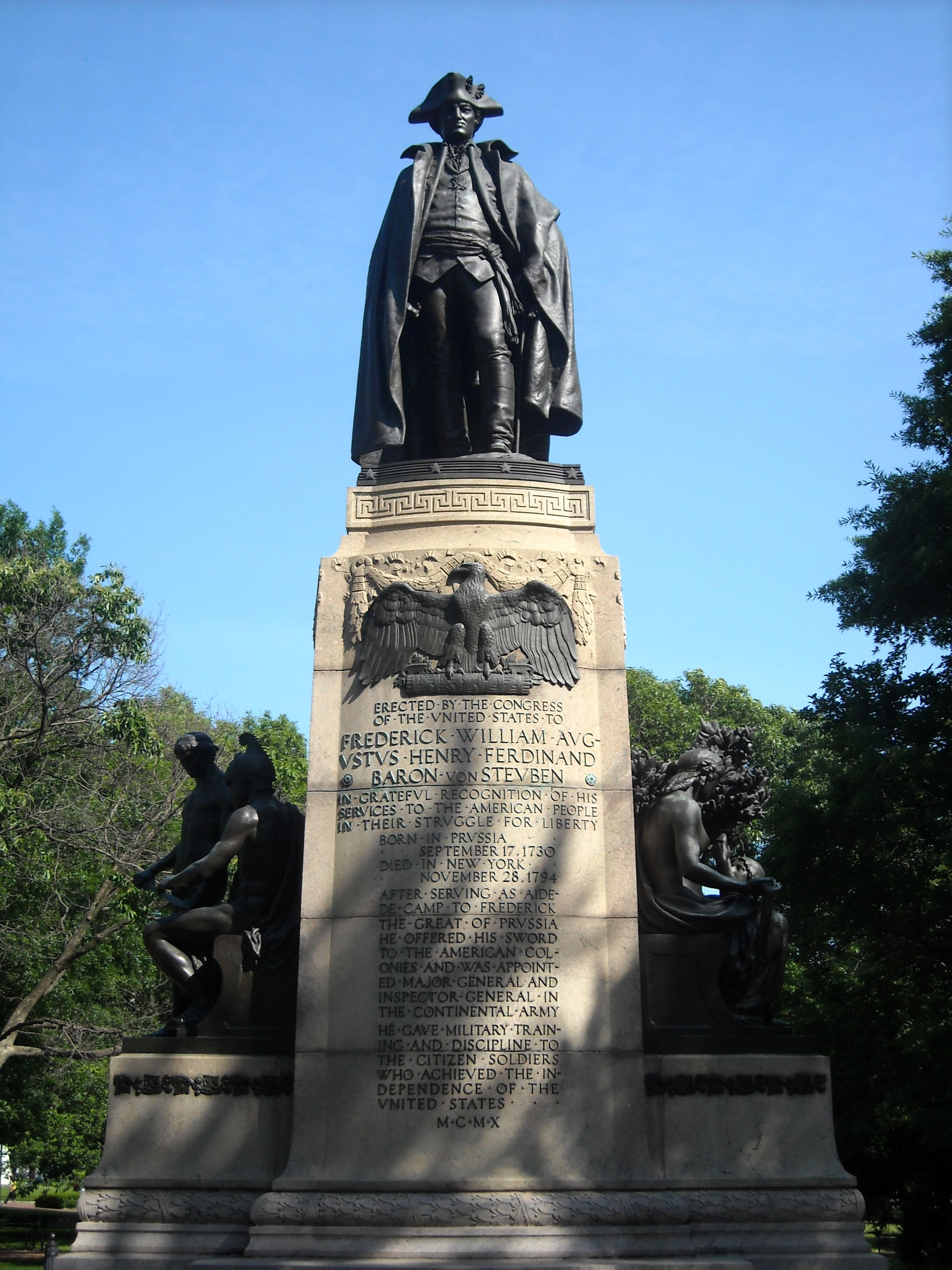
Statue of Friedrich Wilhelm von Steuben

Centerpiece statue of U.S. President Andrew Jackson
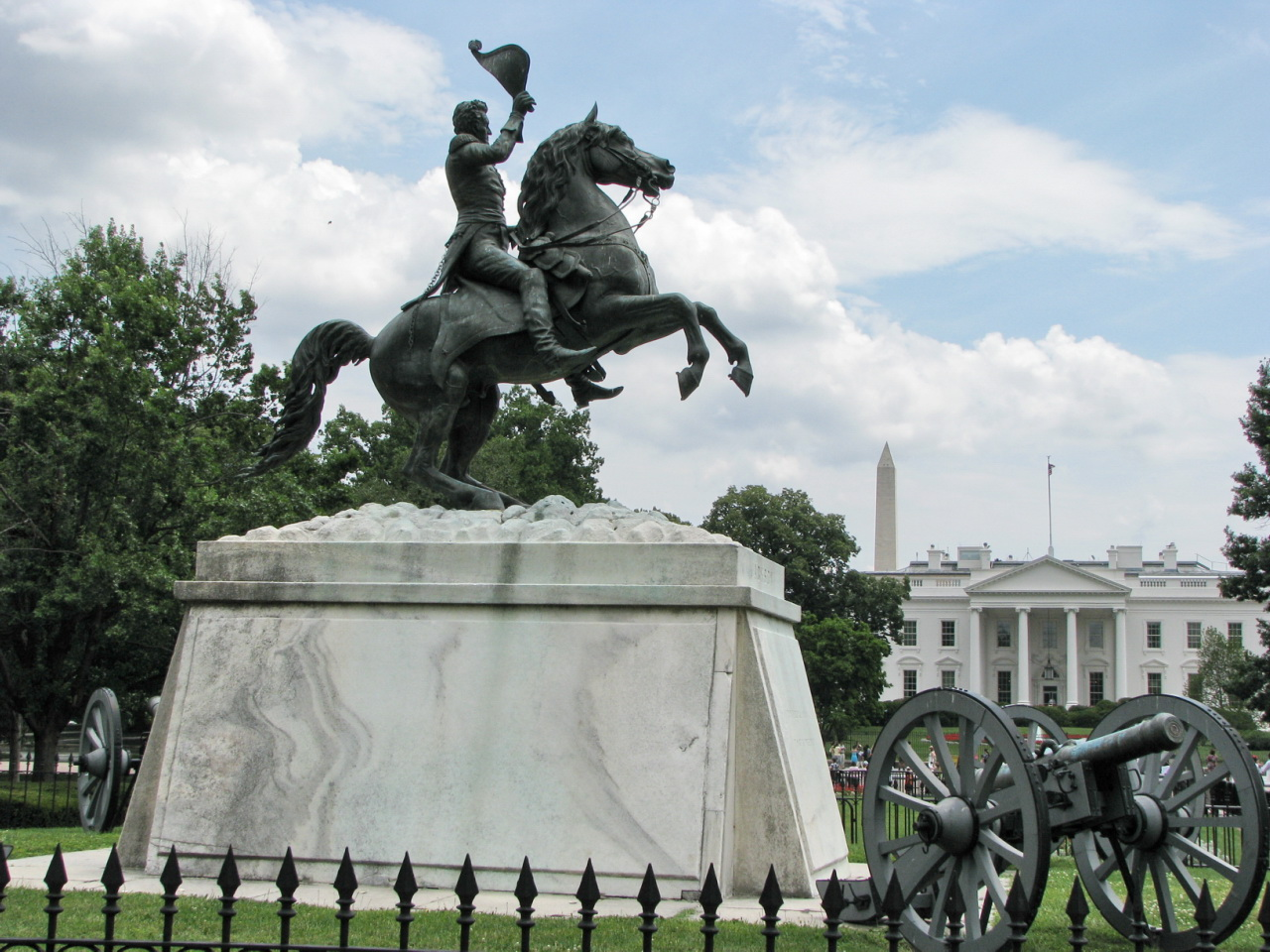

== See also ==
- Architecture of Washington, D.C.
- Navy Yard Urns
