= Cruising for gay sex in Washington, D.C. =

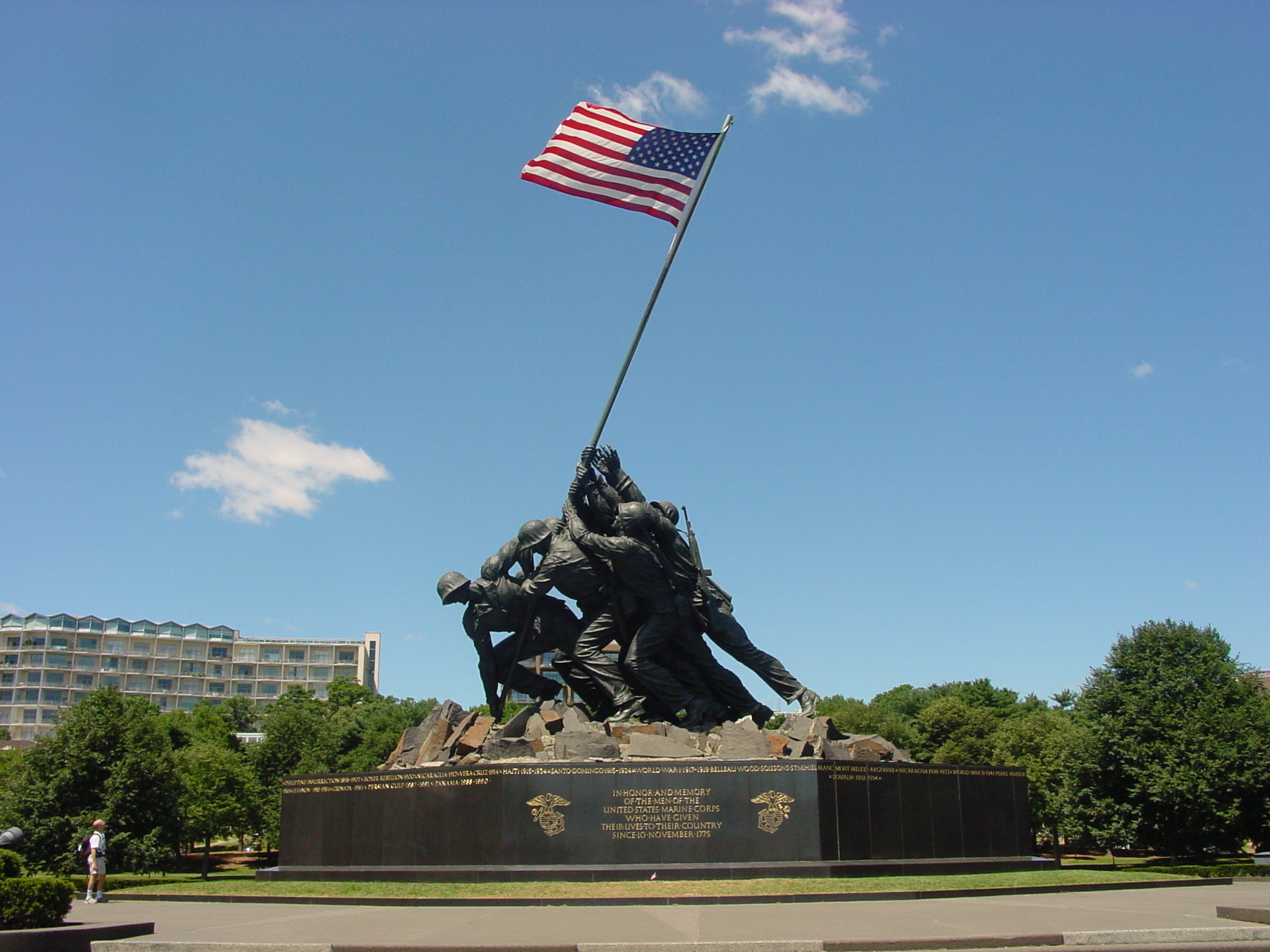
The Marine Corps War Memorial has been a popular place for cruising for gay sex.

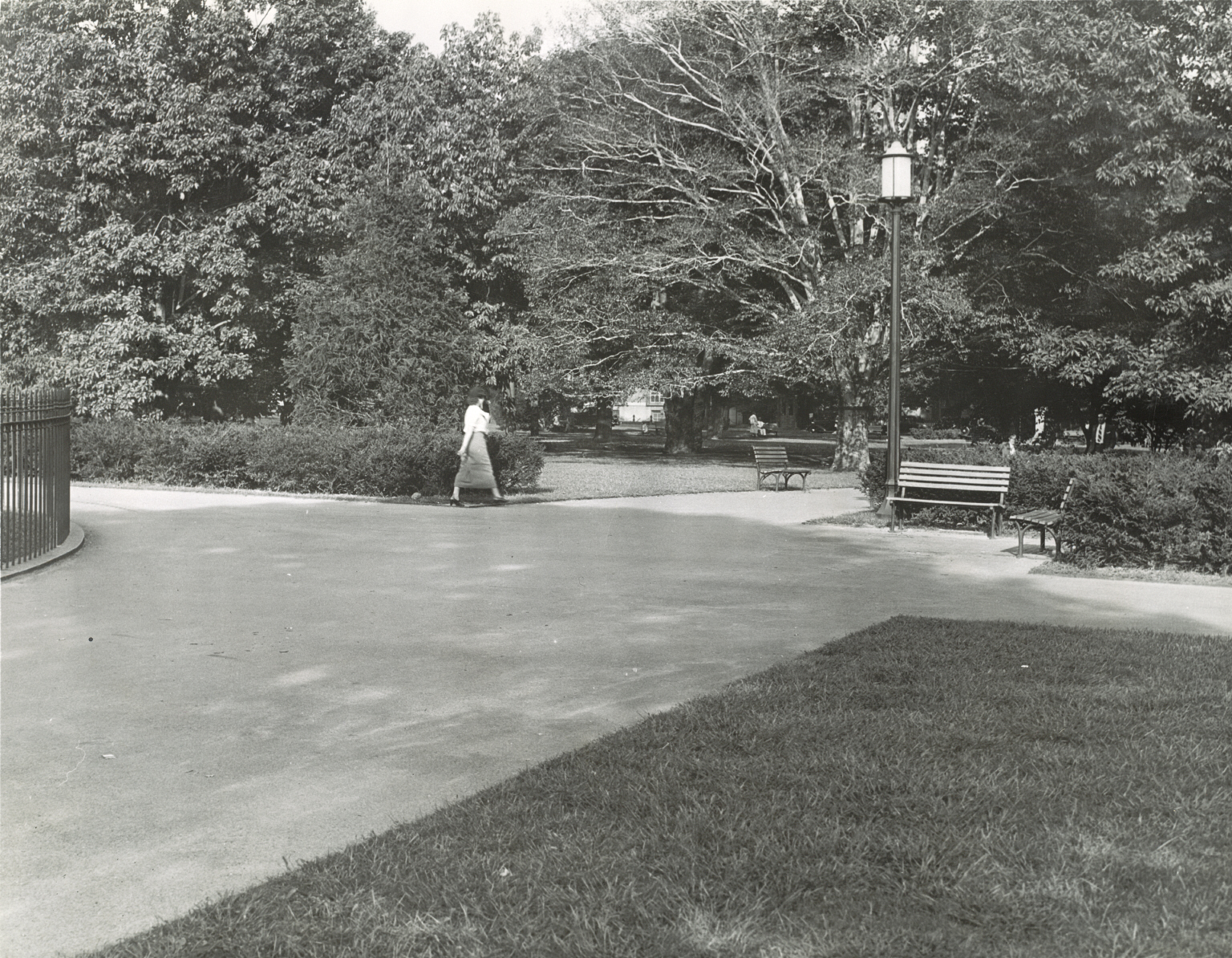
Diarist Jeb Alexander would wait for encounters on the benches of Lafayette Square (shown here in the 1930s)

There has been an established tradition of cruising for gay sex in Washington, D.C., United States.

== History ==
Brett Beemyn identified the city as a meeting point for interracial same-sex relations in the late 19th-century in his 2004 essay "The Geography of Same-Sex Desire: Cruising Men in Washington, DC in the Late Nineteenth and Early Twentieth Centuries". In 1892, 18 men (of whom the majority were African-American) were arrested for engaging in oral sex in Lafayette Square. The 1920s diaries of Jeb Alexander document his cruising in the parks of Washington D.C., especially Lafayette Square. After meeting he and his partner would walk to the secluded grounds of the Lincoln Memorial, or Potomac Park and have oral or anal sex. He would also cruise Farragut Square, Franklin Park, and the grounds around the Washington Monument. Alexander frequently rejected the advances of Henry Gerber, who later founded the Society for Human Rights, the first gay rights organisation in the United States. Alexander nicknamed three benches on the square the "Wishing Bench", the "Magnolia Bench" and the "Nighthawk's Bench". He would sit on the benches for hours waiting for men to approach him before he was told that the best way to meet people was to take tours of the park.

In his book Secret City, James Kirchick wrote that "furtive encounters in public lavatories [and] parks" remained the only option for men who have sex with men in the Washington, D.C. of the 1960s. Other cruising sites included the lavatories at the department stores Garfinckel's and Woodward & Lothrop at lunchtimes and in the afternoon. In his oral history contribution recorded in 2001 for The Rainbow History Project of LGBTQ+ history in the Washington, D.C. area, activist Bruce Pennington of the Gay Liberation Front mentioned several cruising areas. Pennington recalled the corner of 31 Street and Dumbarton Street near the Georgetown Grill which saw "Lots of Georgetown boys, lots of upstanding citizens" and the "2000 block" of Massachusetts Avenue which was busy before a hotel was built as well as the men's room at Dupont Circle which was "so obvious a place". Dupont Circle was nicknamed the 'fruit loop' with "never ending game of musical benches with men moving from one to another" and a "prime daytime extravagance".

A 2001 article in The Washington Post identified the park around the Marine Corps War Memorial, Turkey Run Park and "nearly half a dozen other spots along the Virginia shore of the Potomac" as "so notorious that they appear on Internet directories of gay male cruising spots". The Marine Corps War Memorial in nearby Arlington, Virginia was a popular cruising spot in the 20th century. Activist Bruce Pennngton said the memorial was "never spoken of in terms of safety". In his 1996 book The Thirty Years' Wars, Andrew Kopkind wrote that the view from the monument meant that "Lovers can meet, or make out, with a breathtaking view of the Pentagon, the Capitol and the Washington Monument for whatever symbolic value any of those edifices carry". A wooded patch near Rock Creek and the P Street Bridge was also popular.

== Police crackdowns ==
Representative Jon Hinson was arrested at the memorial in 1976 after he exposed himself to an undercover police officer. In 1981, he was arrested and charged for a second time with attempted sodomy for performing oral sex on a male employee of the Library of Congress in a restroom of the Longworth Building of the House of Representatives. The restroom had been targeted for a sting operation after complaints. The chief of the U.S. Capitol Police had asked Speaker Tip O'Neill if representatives should be warned about the operation to which he disagreed.

From early 2000 to March 2001 the U.S. Park Police arrested 293 people for charges relating to public sex in parks along the George Washington Memorial Parkway. The arrests were for offences including "indecent acts" and indecent exposure. Plainclothes officers were used in the arrests. The U.S. Magistrate Judge Theresa C. Buchanan said that she had been "wrestling with these cases in my own mind as to what to do ... By this conduct, the park is no longer available to others, to tourists ...".
