= Hecht Company Warehouse =

- U.S. National Register of Historic Places
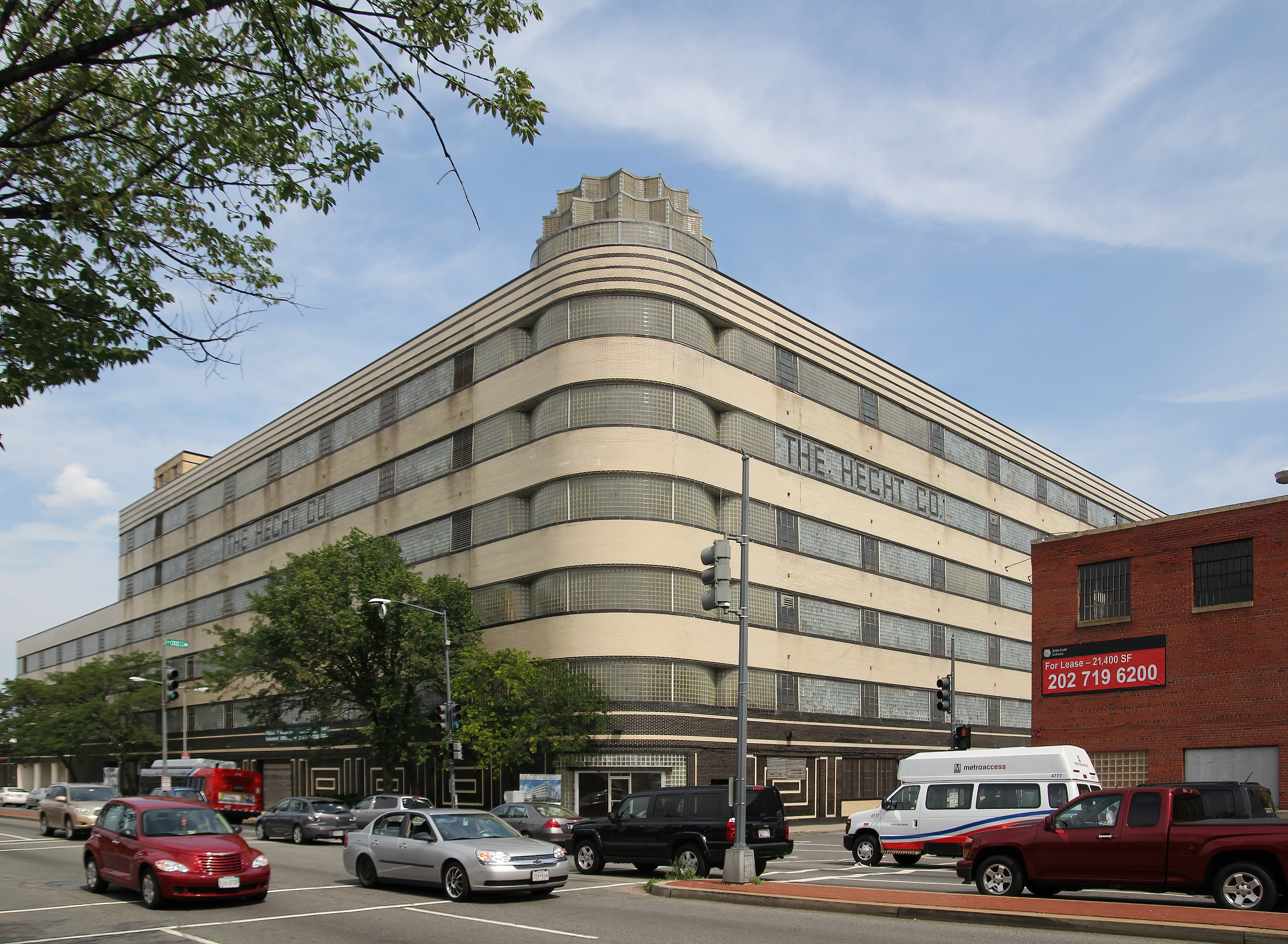

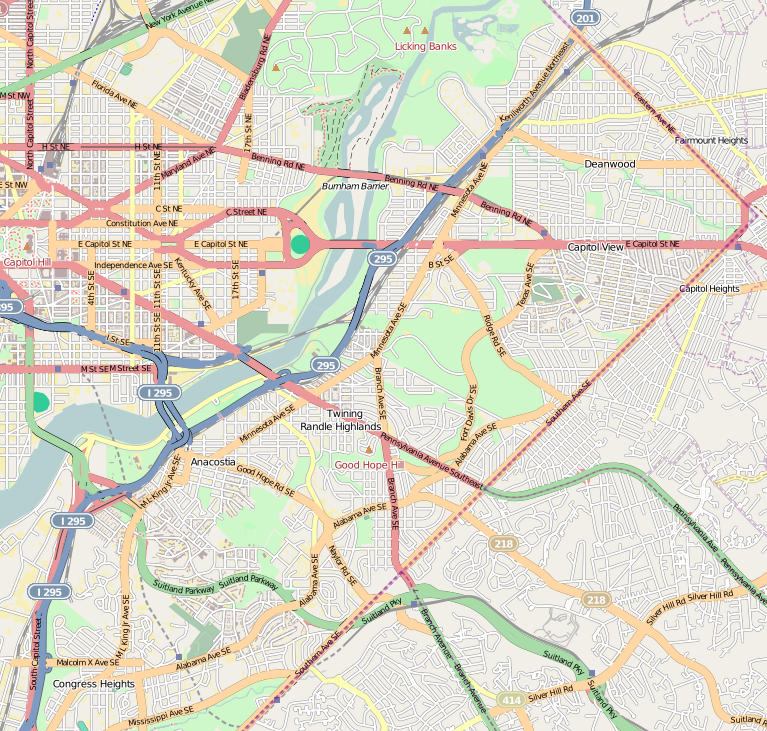
- Location within Washington, D.C. Location within the District of Columbia Location within the United States
- Location: 1401 New York Ave., NE., Washington, D.C.
- Coordinates: 38°54′52″N 76°59′6″W
- Built: 1937
- Architect: Abbott, Merkt & Co.; Steel, Gilbert V.
- Architectural style: Moderne
- NRHP reference No.: 94000446
- Added to NRHP: May 25, 1994

The Hecht Company Warehouse in Washington, D.C. is a Streamline Moderne style building. Designed by engineer Gilbert V. Steel of the New York engineering firm Abbott and Merkt, and prominently located on New York Avenue in Ivy City, it served as the central warehouse for The Hecht Company from its construction in 1937 and expansion in 1948. The building uses glass block extensively, culminating in a twelve-pointed star-shaped cupola at the corner, which is illuminated at night. Black brick interspersed with glass block spells out "The Hecht Co" at the fifth floor.

At its opening, the building featured an in-house vehicle repair shop, air conditioning for the basement and first two floors, and three railroad track platforms.

A careful rehabilitation was carried out in 1992, using matching materials. The site and surrounding area are currently under redevelopment to turn the building into a mixed-use retail and residential complex called the Hecht Warehouse District.

== See also ==
- Woodward & Lothrop Service Warehouse
