= Pierre-Jules Cavelier =

French sculptor

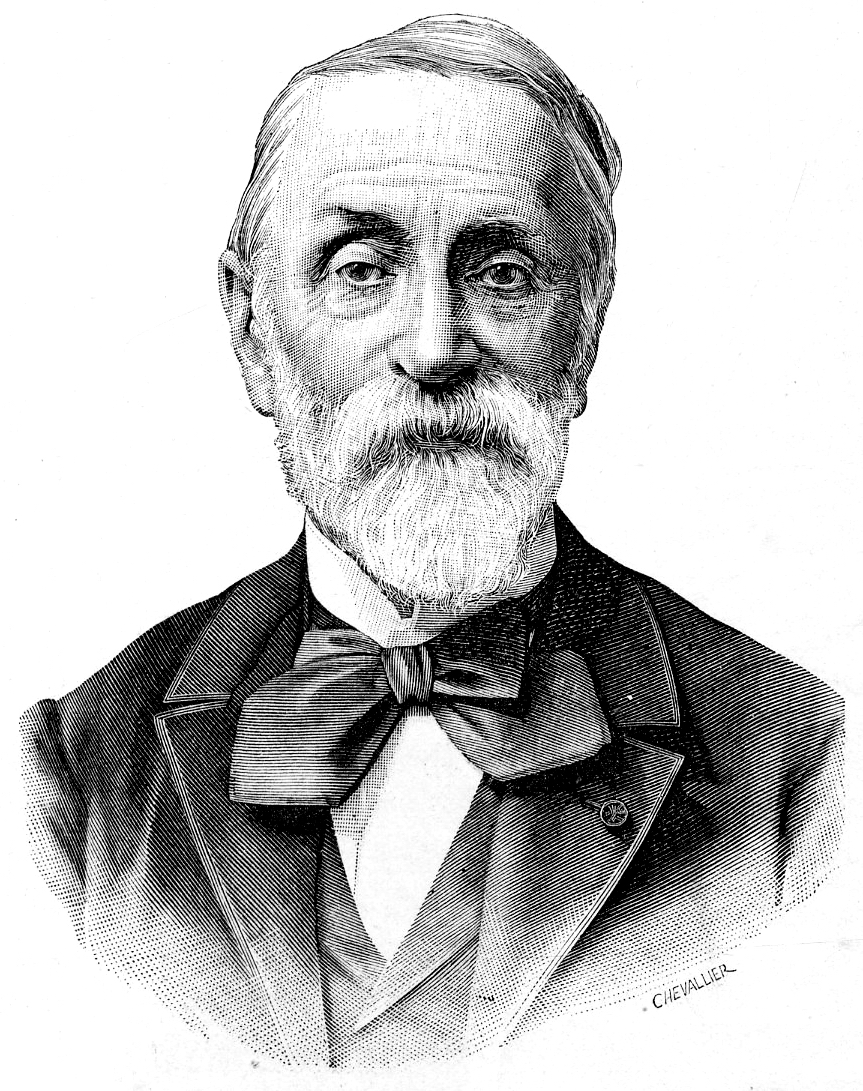
Pierre-Jules Cavelier

Pierre-Jules Cavelier (French pronunciation: [pjɛʁ ʒyl kavəlje]; 30 August 1814, in Paris – 28 January 1894, in Paris) was a French academic sculptor.

== Biography ==
The son of a silversmith and furniture maker, Cavelier was born in Paris. He was a student of the sculptors David d'Angers and the painter Paul Delaroche, Cavelier won the Prix de Rome in 1842 with a plaster statue of Diomedes Entering the Palladium. The young sculptor lived at the Villa Medici from 1843–47.

Appointed in 1864 Professor at the École des beaux-arts, he trained many students there, including René Rozet, Édouard Lantéri, Hippolyte Lefèbvre, Louis-Ernest Barrias, Eugène Guillaume, Fernand Hamar, the British Alfred Gilbert and the American George Grey Barnard, as well as conducting his own prolific career as a sculptor.

== Notable works ==
- Two caryatids, sketch group, terracotta, Paris, Musée du Louvre, 1854
- Paris on the exterior of the Gare du Nord, Paris
- Cornélie, Mother of Gracchi group, marble, Paris, Orsay Museum, 1861
- Angel on the bell tower, Saint-Germain l'Auxerrois, Paris

== Gallery ==
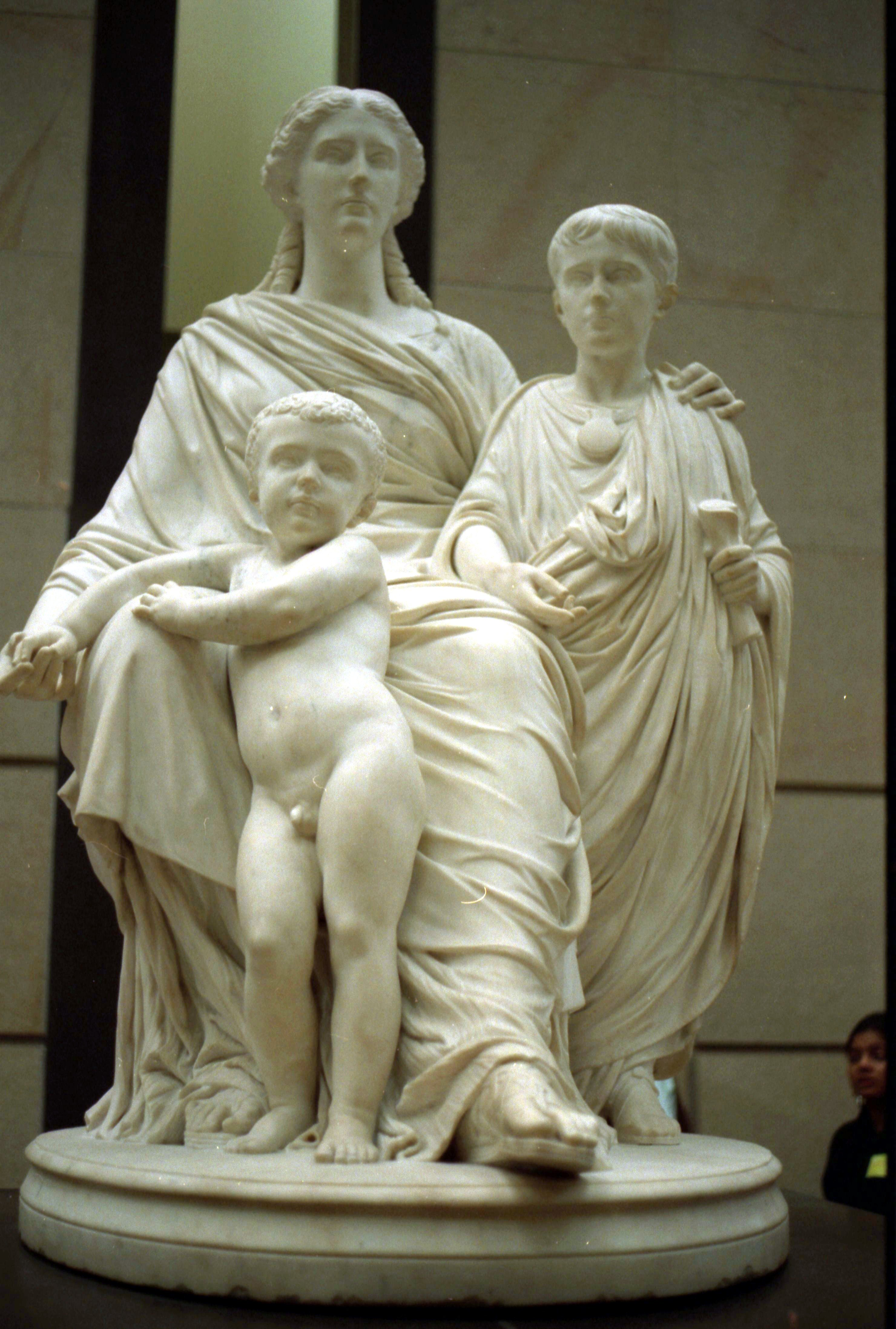
Cornelia, mother of the Gracchi, Musée de Orsay

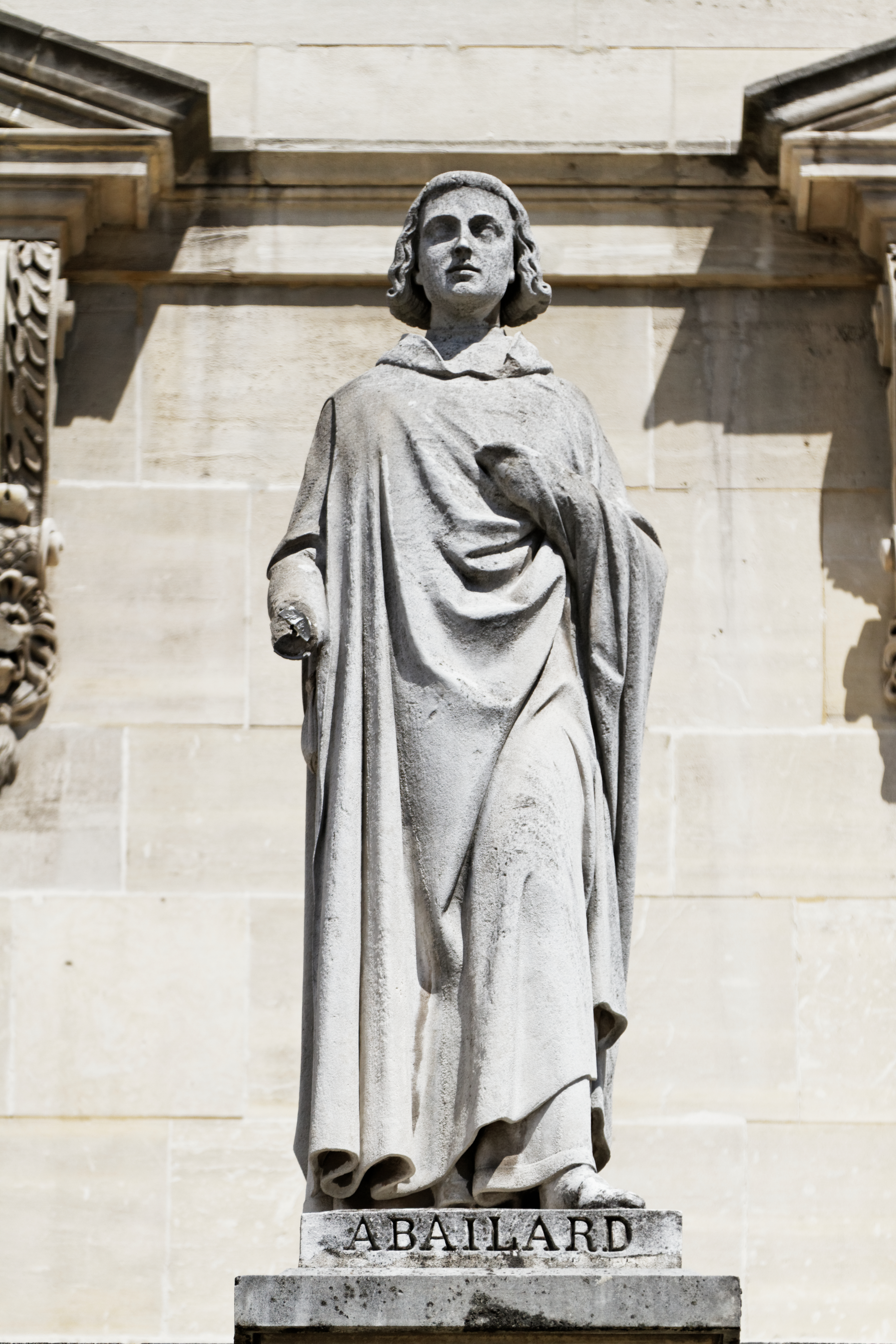
Pierre Abelard at the Louvre

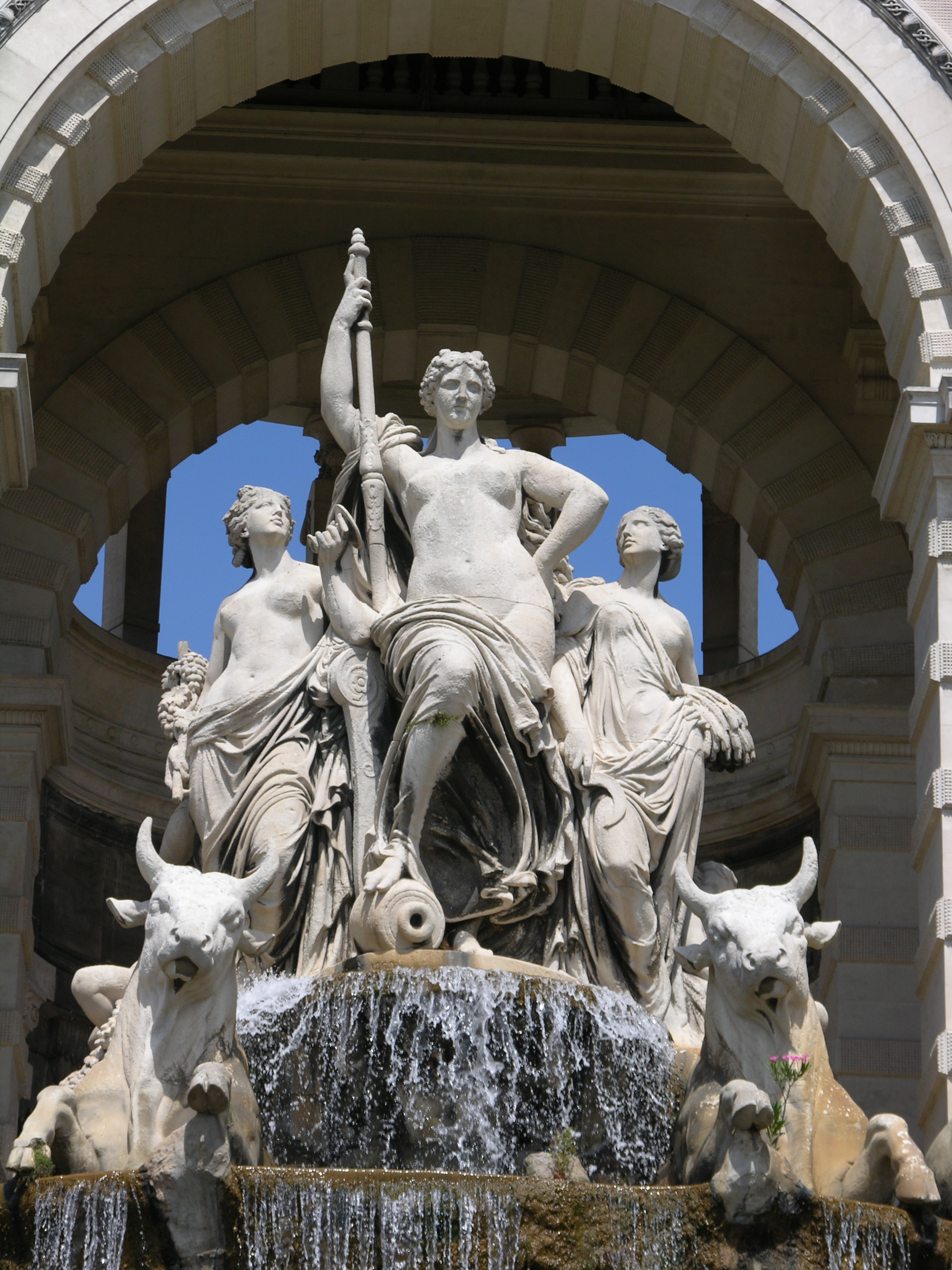
Endurance, Palais Longchamp

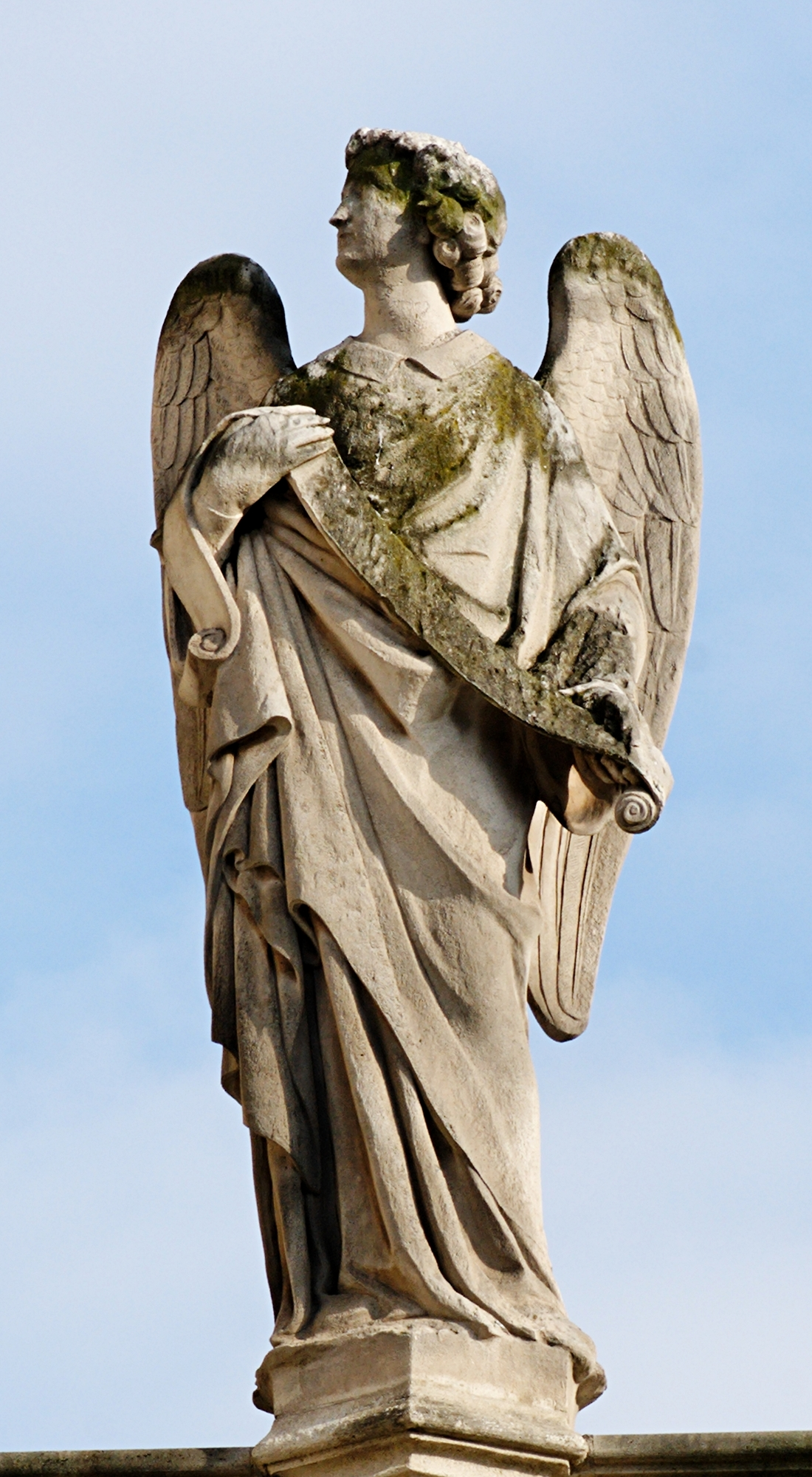
Angel on the bell tower, Saint-Germain l'Auxerrois
