= The Volunteer of 1792 =

Statue

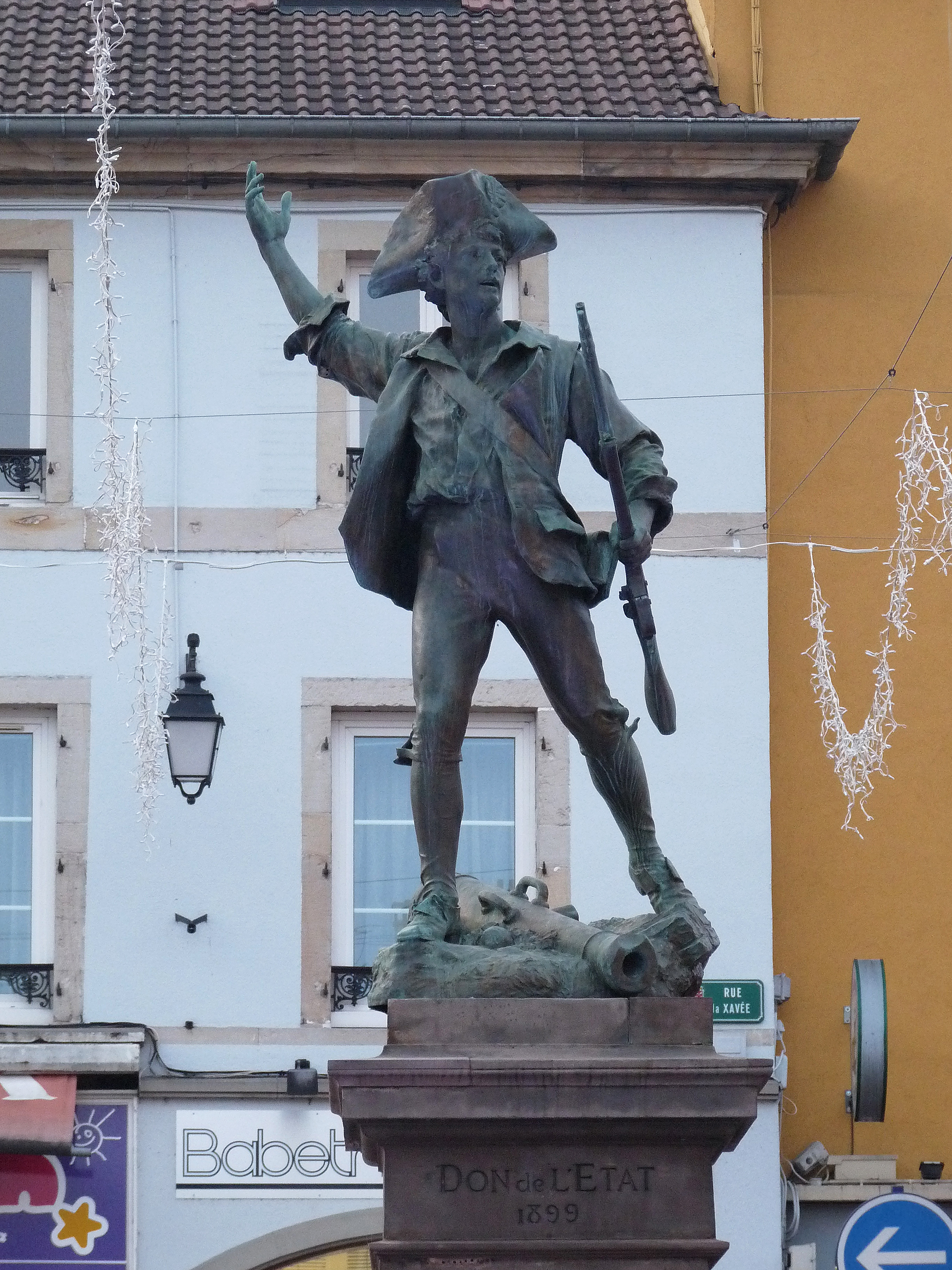
- The Volunteer of 1792 in Remiremont
- Artist: Paul-François Choppin
- Medium: Bronze sculpture

The Volunteer of 1792 (French: Le Volontaire de 1792) is a statue created in 1899 by the sculptor Paul-François Choppin.

== History ==
The statue was commissioned to honor the inhabitants of the district of Remiremont who were the first volunteers to defend their homeland during the chaos of 1792. It has become the emblem of the city and stands at the intersection of rue Charles-de-Gaulle and rue de la Xavée, in the city of Remiremont in the Vosges department.

From the ranks of these first volunteers emerged General Humbert, a native of Saint-Nabord, hired on 10 August 1792 and appointed Brigadier General on 9 April 1794 at the age of 26.

The statue and its base have been listed as historical monuments since 27 February 1996. The base bears on one side the inscription "A volunteer of 1792" and on another "State gift 1899".

== Postage stamp ==
The 15 May 1995 La Poste issues a 2.80 francs stamp designed by Louis Arquer and dedicated to Remiremont, on which the statue appears in the foreground. A First Day card and envelope are published for this occasion.

In 2009, a personalized stamp designed by the town hall of Remiremont once again honored the Volunteer, this time showing it from the front.

== Posterity ==
The cultural center of Remiremont has been named “Espace Le Volontaire”.

== Notes ==
=== Bibliography ===
- Charles Vosgien, Le Livre d'or des familles de Remiremont. Victimes de la Révolution. Volontaires de 1792, impr. de V. Collot, Épinal, 1889, 32 p.
- "L'Enrôlement des volontaires de 1792" : Thomas Couture, 1815-1879 : les artistes au service de la patrie en danger, Musée départemental de l'Oise, Beauvais, 1989, p. 233-234 ISBN 2-901290-05-1 (exposition au, Musée départemental de l'Oise, 5 octobre-31 décembre 1989)
