= Woodward & Lothrop =

Defunct department store chain

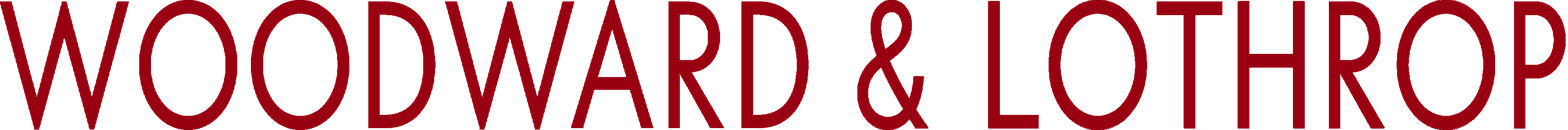
- Type: Subsidiary
- Industry: Retail
- Founded: 1887; 139 years ago
- Defunct: November 1995; 30 years ago
- Fate: Acquired and Converted into JCPenney
- Successor: JCPenney
- Headquarters: Washington, D.C., U.S.
- Products: General Merchandise
- Parent: Taubman Centers (1984-1995)
- Website: None

Woodward & Lothrop was a department store chain headquartered in Washington, D.C. that began as the capital's first department store in 1887. Woodies, as it was often nicknamed, maintained stores in the Mid-Atlantic United States. Its flagship store was a fixture of Washington, D.C.'s downtown shopping district, competing with Garfinckel's and acquiring Palais Royal. The chain filed for bankruptcy in January 1994 and completed liquidation in November 1995, with most locations were sold and converted into JCPenney. The flagship building is a D.C. historic landmark that became the center of controversy over competing visions for DC's urban renewal after the chain's demise, and the former service warehouse in the city's northeast is also listed as a landmark.

== History ==
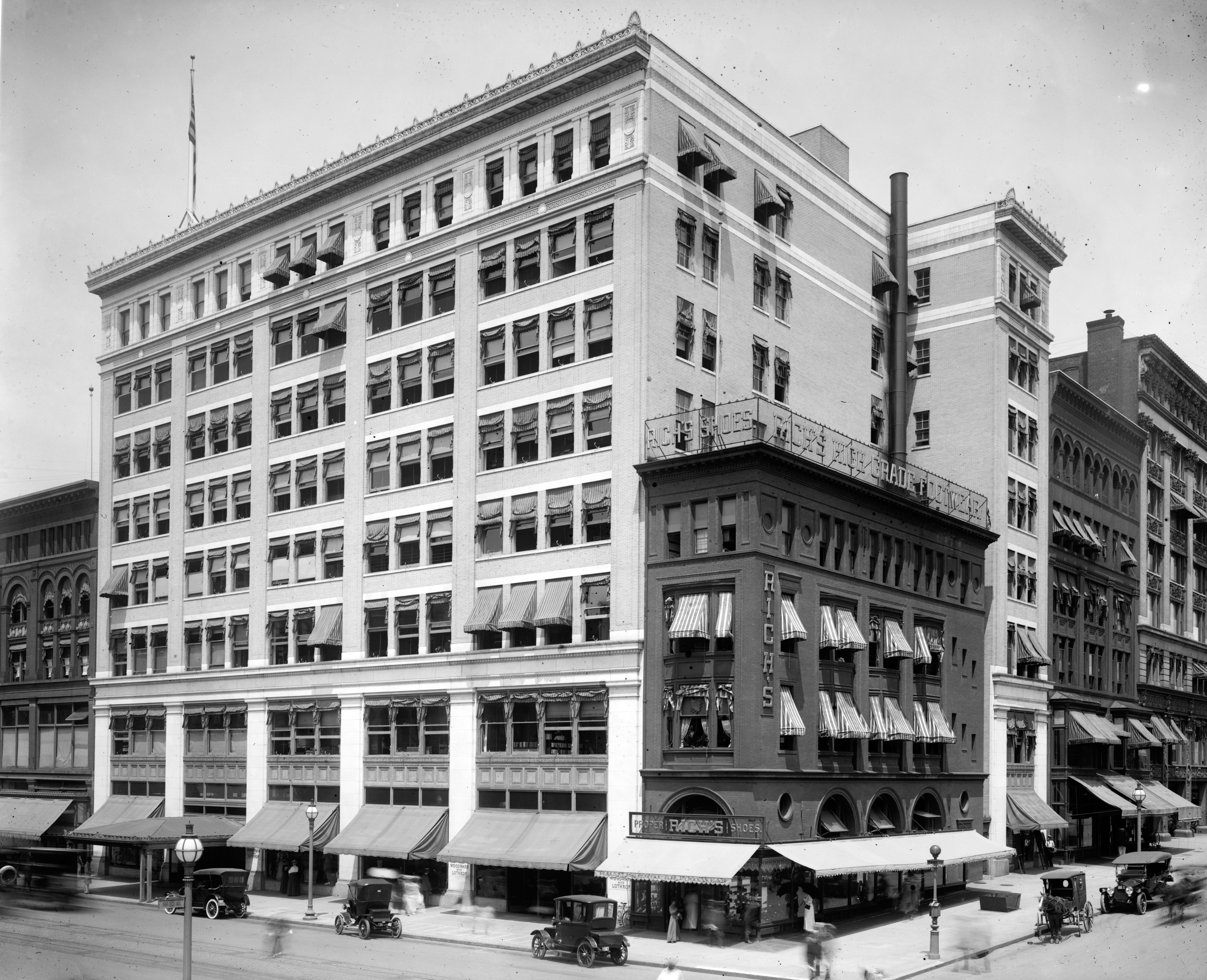
Woodward & Lothrop store in Washington, D.C. circa 1910s

Samuel Walter Woodward (1848 – August 2, 1917) and Alvin Mason Lothrop (1847–1912) opened a dry goods store in Chelsea, Massachusetts, in 1873, and maintained several stores in the Boston area. In partnership with Charles E. Cochrane, on February 8, 1880 they moved to Washington. For many years, their department store would sponsor a "Founders Day Sale" in early February to commemorate the move.

Woodward, Lothrop & Cochrane opened at 705 Market Space (now the United States Navy Memorial) at the intersection of Pennsylvania Avenue and 7th Street N.W., in Washington, D.C.'s downtown shopping district. The first store was so successful that within a year, they moved to a larger location at 921 Pennsylvania Avenue. After flooding in 1886, they moved again to the corner of 11th and F Streets NW. Woodward and Lothrop purchased Cochrane's share of the partnership, and the new store was renamed Woodward & Lothrop. The lavatories of the store were popular places for men Cruising for gay sex in Washington, D.C. at lunchtimes and in the afternoon.

Woodies expanded into suburban shopping malls after World War II, but the owning families resisted expansion by amalgamation, and the chain grew slowly. It became a target of takeover attempts in the 1980s, resisting a leveraged buyout by Ronald Baron in February 1984 but accepting a $277 million (~$706 million in 2024) bid later that year from Detroit shopping center mogul A. Alfred Taubman.

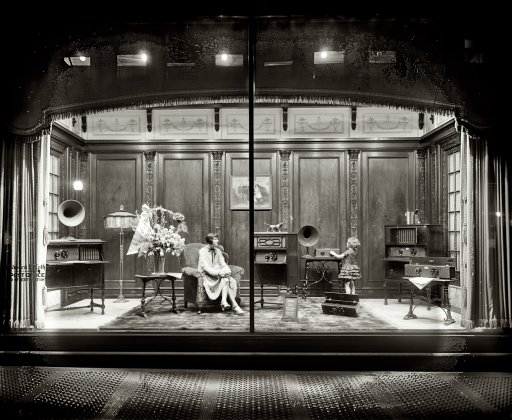
Display window at the Woodward & Lothrop flagship store in Washington, D.C. circa 1928

But Taubman had incurred substantial debt during his '80s acquisitions, which included the Philadelphia-based Wanamaker's department stores in 1986 as well as Sotheby's auction house and various properties. The early 1990s recession, while historically mild, disproportionately impacted real estate and department store retail. The greater Washington area was also affected by sharp reductions in defense spending after the end of the Cold War, leading to a loss of consumer confidence.

Woodward & Lothrop, Inc., filed for Chapter 11 bankruptcy protection on January 18, 1994, with $608 million in total assets and $659 million in total liabilities. Drastic cost-cutting and increased sales figures did not return the firm to profitability, however, and the chain, including its John Wanamaker subsidiary, was liquidated. On June 21, 1995, seven of the remaining Woodward & Lothrop locations were sold to J. C. Penney and the rest plus the Wanamaker's locations were sold to May Department Stores Company. By November 1995, all Woodies stores had completed liquidation sales and were permanently closed.

== Flagship store ==
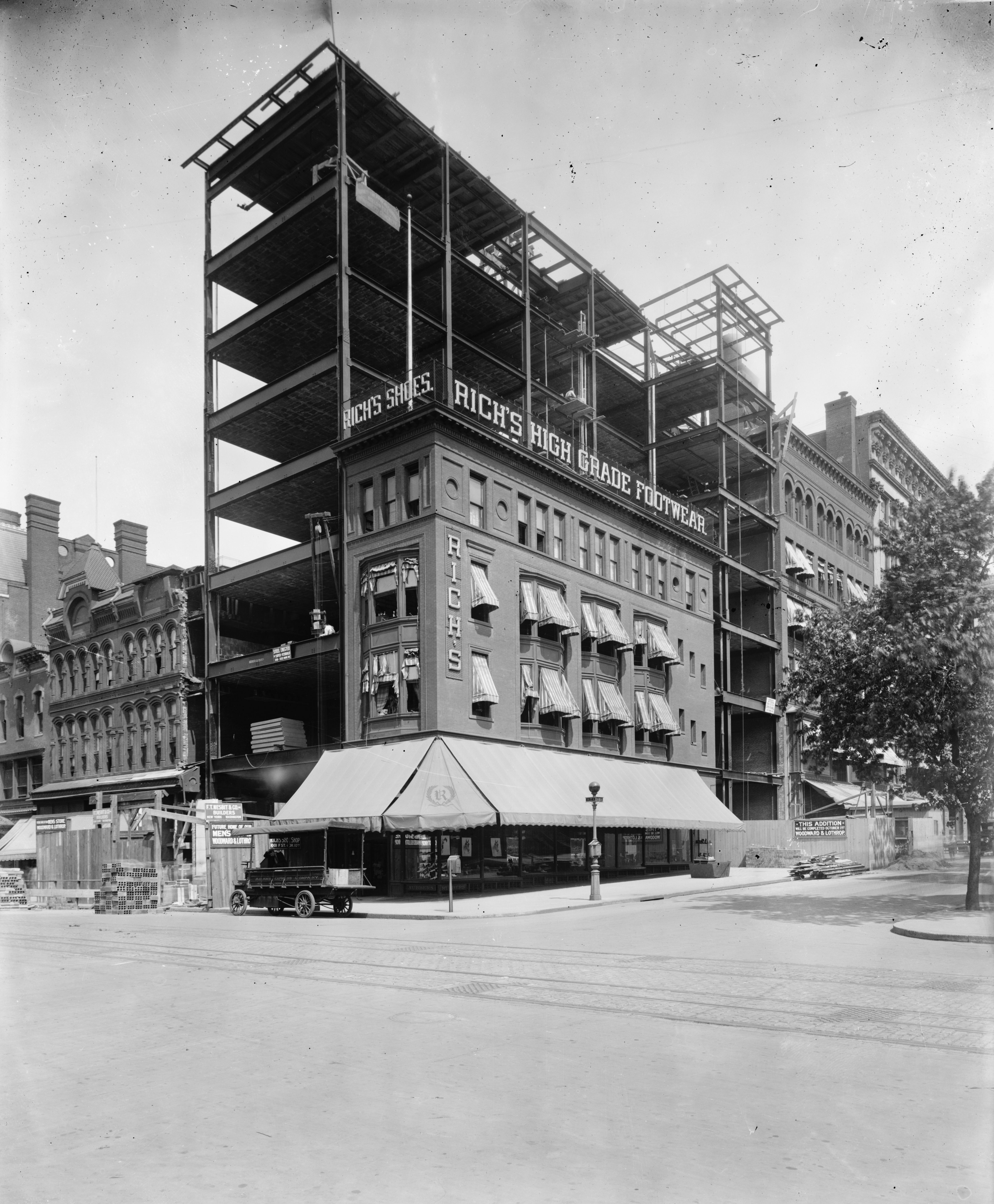
Woodward & Lothrop's flagship store under construction in Washington, D.C.

Soon after moving into the historic Carlisle building in 1887, Woodward & Lothrop outgrew its space and began expanding, purchasing the neighboring properties. By 1897 it occupied almost the entire block surrounded by 10th, 11th, F, and G Streets NW. In 1898 and 1902, the buildings were renovated behind a new facade facing G Street designed by Henry Ives Cobb. Two additional floors were added in 1912 and 1913, and yet another building added in 1925.

The building attained its lasting form in 1927. It stands ten stories and once held over 400,000 square feet (37,000 m^{2}) of retail space; the exterior was decorated in cast iron and leaded glass accents with flower designs and the Woodward & Lothrop monogram. It was declared a D.C. Historic Landmark in 1964.

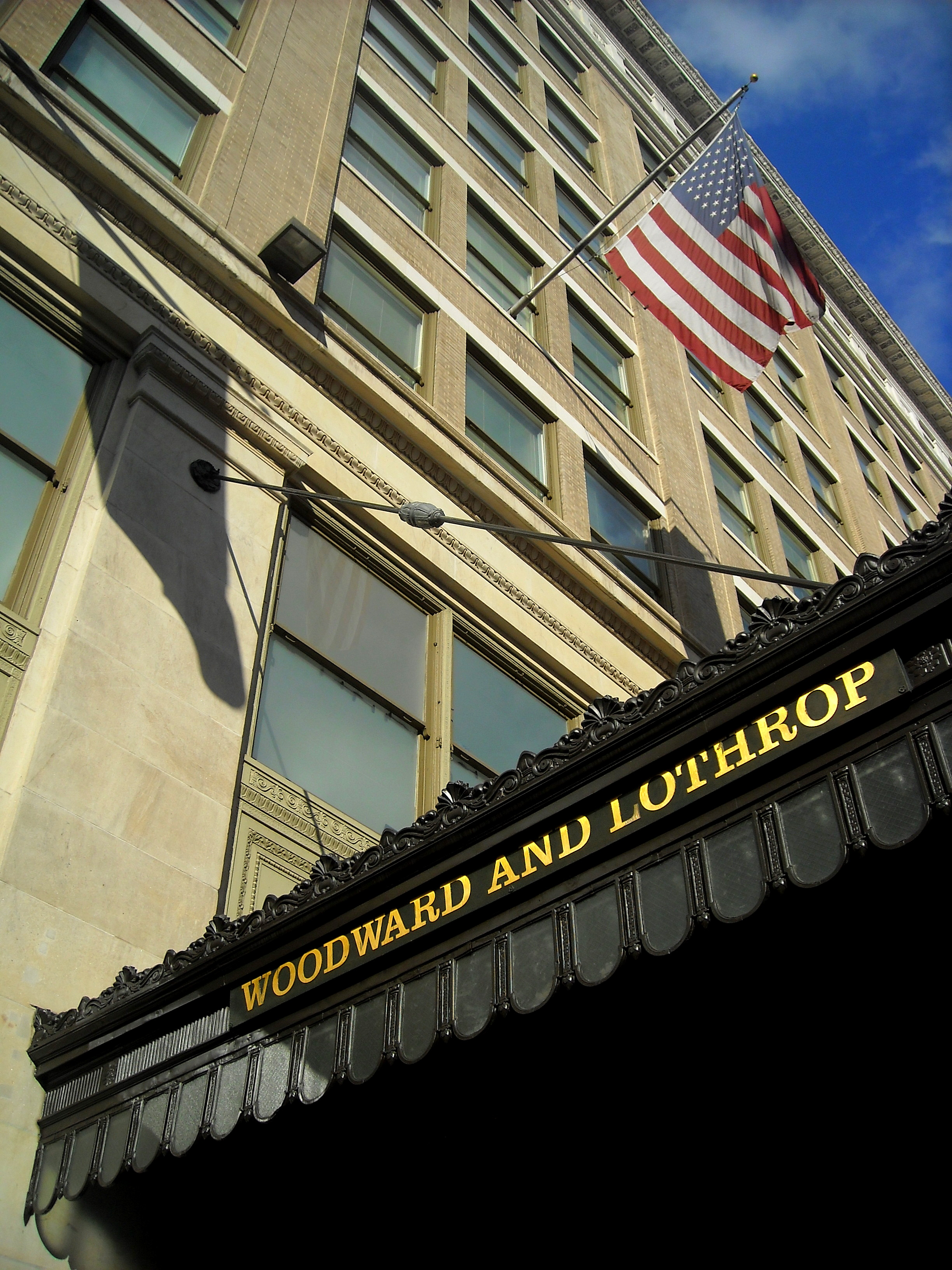
Woodward & Lothrop entrance sign to the former flagship store in Washington, D.C. (2008)

The store hired the architect Michael Graves to redesign its street floor in the 1980s where he incorporated the company's signature W&L monogram plaques on the columns.

After the chain's liquidation, the store stood empty while developers and city officials debated its future. The city first lobbied to have the location reopened as a Macy's, but Macy's owner, Federated Department Stores (now Macy's Inc), demurred; the space was too large, in need of renovation, and situated in downtown Washington, where shopping had declined relative to the suburbs. Finally, the Washington National Opera purchased the building in 1996 for $18 million (~$33.1 million in 2024), seeking to have it renovated into its new home.

Unfortunately, the cost of converting the retail space into an opera house proved daunting: $200 million. It remained empty until 1999 when it was sold to developer Douglas Jemal for $28.2 million (~$49.8 million in 2024). Neighborhood activists wanted Jemal to convert the building for mixed use, including arts space, restaurants, and housing as well as retail, but Jemal sought to use it for mixed office and commercial space instead. The District of Columbia Zoning Commission declined Jemal's proposal, and the building remained empty for two more years.

Finally in 2001, the Commission approved the retail-office plan (on the condition Jemal build housing at another site), and renovation got underway. The building reopened after almost a decade in 2003. Swedish clothing retailer Hennes & Mauritz (H&M) was the first major tenant.

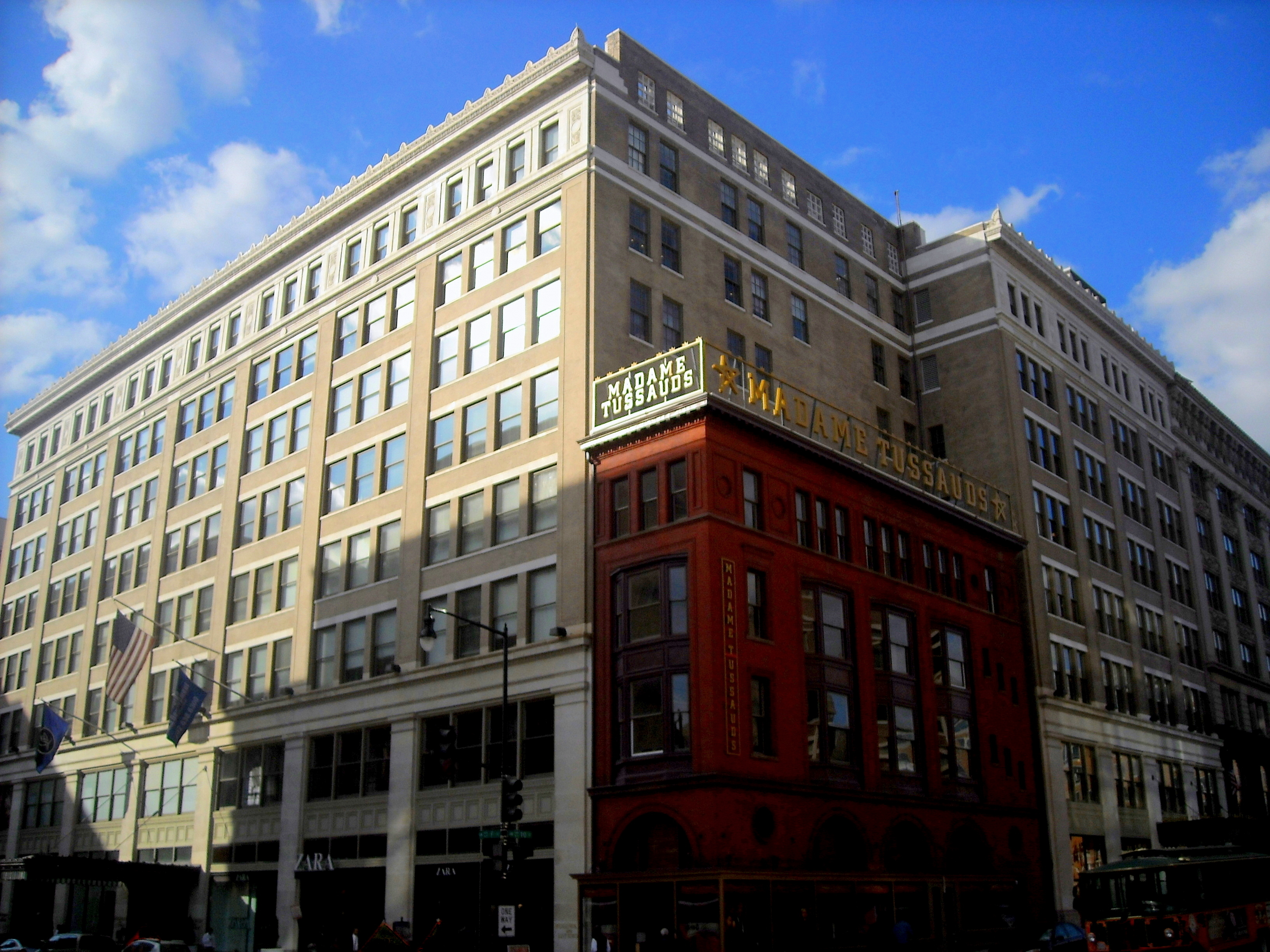
Madame Tussauds moved into the adjacent Rich's Shoes building, on the corner of 10th & F sts., in 2007.

On January 29, 2004, a fire struck the building. Just before 10pm, firefighters responded to visible heavy fire on the 10th Street side. After twenty minutes, most of the fire was knocked down; the cause of the fire was found to be accidental, probably caused by a baseboard space heater.

On August 21, 2007, furniture and housewares retailer West Elm opened in the building. Also in 2007, a three-floor Zara opened while the D.C. branch of Madame Tussauds wax museum opened in the adjacent Rich's Shoes building, which had been a holdout as Woodward & Lothrop expanded its old flagship store to cover the entire block (see photo at right).

Besides the downtown Washington store, the former Woodward & Lothrop Service Warehouse at 131 M Street, Northeast was declared a D.C. Historic Landmark in 1993. An example of Streamline Moderne architecture, it was added to the National Register of Historic Places in 2005.

== Woodward & Lothrop in the community ==
Both Woodward and Lothrop became active in civic life. Woodward, for instance, became president of the Washington City YMCA in 1898, and donated significant sums of money for the renovation of its facilities. In addition, Woodward's daughter and heir, Helen, and her husband Luke Ingalls Wilson later donated the bulk of the acreage of their Bethesda estate for the formation of the National Institutes of Health. After Wilson's death from cancer, Helen was instrumental in the creation of the National Cancer Institute. The store they founded itself became a fixture. In the 1920s it boasted at least 67 retail departments, as well as a travel agency, theater, infirmary, merry-go-round, and traveling art exhibits. According to one customer, Woodies was truly part of the social fabric; part department store, restaurant, and showcase for talent shows. Proper young ladies from schools such as Bryn Mawr, Stephens, Vassar, Radcliffe and Mt. Holyoke would troop into Woodies for their spring and summer frocks to wear at weekend dances.

== Specialty products ==
The Woodward & Lothrop toy department introduced two phenomena to the American public. Harold and John Porter, who comprised the Porter Chemical Company of Hagerstown, Maryland, began manufacturing chemistry sets in 1916. Woodward & Lothrop became the first major retailer to offer them for sale, and "Chemcraft" kits soon appeared at other retailers in the country.

In the 1950s, the wife of a Woodward & Lothrop buyer saw a demonstration of Play-Doh modeling clay at an educational convention. This led to a successful in-store demo, and the sale of Play-Doh in W&L stores, and soon in toy departments throughout the United States.

Slush mugs, which made smoothie-like "slush" drinks out of soda or fruit juice when frozen, was a Woodies specialty in the 1970s.

== See also ==
- List of defunct department stores of the United States
- Woodward & Lothrop: A Store Worthy of the Nation's Capital. The History Press. 2013. ISBN 978-1-62619-060-3.
