= Fernand Hamar =

French sculptor

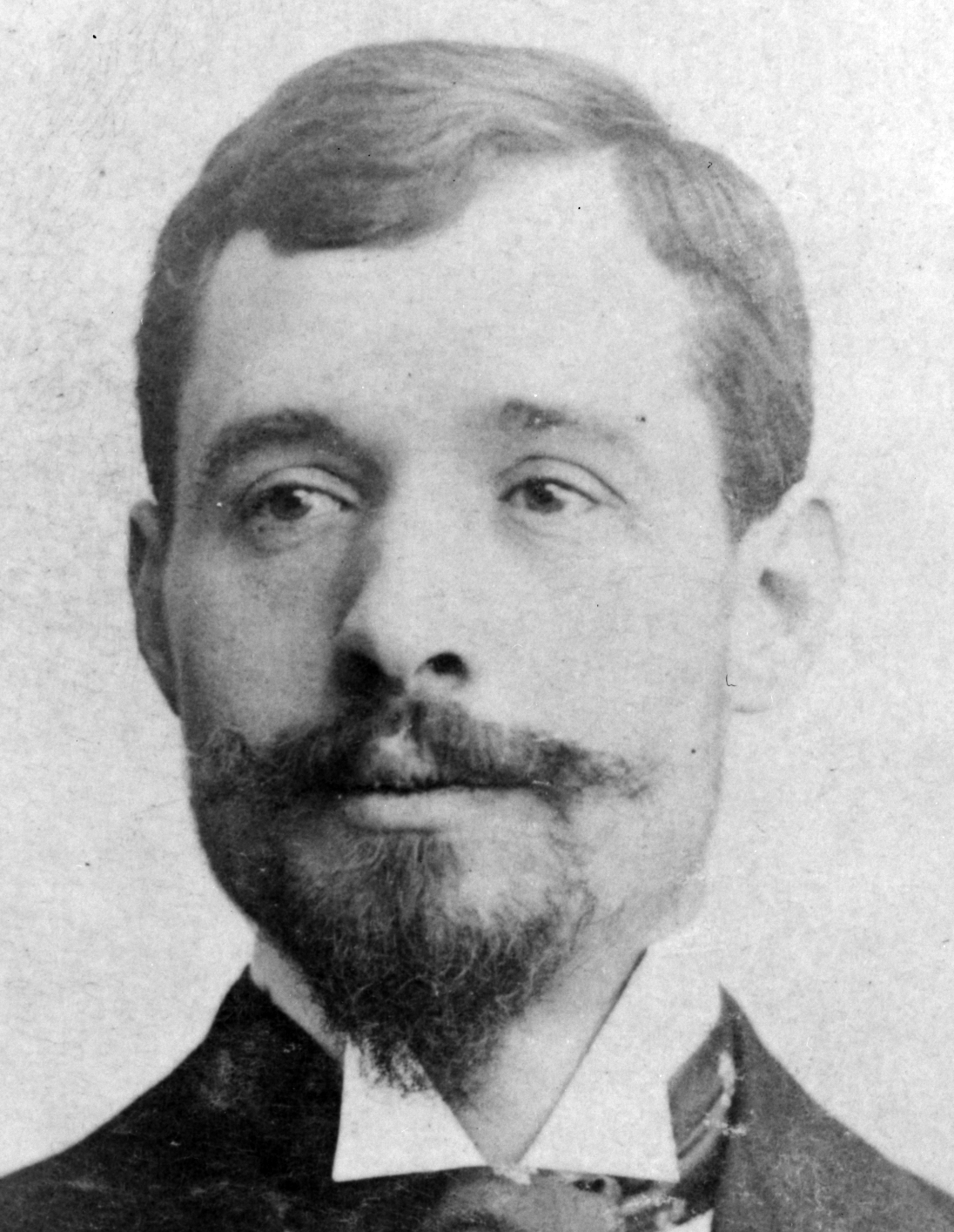
- Hamar in 1896
- Born: Fernand Joseph Job Hamar; 15 July 1869; Paris, France
- Died: 10 March 1943 (aged 73); Paris, France
- Known for: Sculpture

Fernand Joseph Job Hamar, born 15 July 1869 in Vendôme and died 10 March 1943 in Paris, was a French sculptor.

== Childhood and training ==
Fernand Hamar was the eldest of Alexis Hamar and Marie Guillot. He had a sister, Marguerite and a little brother, Maurice. During the Franco-Prussian War of 1870, between the Battle of Orleans (1870) and the Battle of Le Mans, the Prussian army pushed the Army of the Loire around Le Temple. The noise of the cannons caused the deafness of Fernand Hamar, according to his family. Around his tenth birthday, he entered the Institut National de Jeunes Sourds de Paris.

In the Parisian school for the deaf, Hamar learned sculpture. He enrolled at the École nationale supérieure des arts décoratifs on 2 October 1886, where he studied for four years. On 4 March 1890 he enrolled at the École nationale supérieure des beaux-arts and on 9 March 1890 he became a student of Jules Cavelier at his request, then of Louis-Ernest Barrias and then of Paul-François Choppin, himself deaf. He competed unsuccessfully for the Prix de Rome and exhibited at the Salon des Artistes Français.

On 19 December 1916 Fernand Hamar married Paule Monsaingeon (1880–1970) who gave him two children: Manon and Patrice.

== Last years ==
In 1937, Fernand Hamar created, with other former students, the association of the Amicale des Anciens Pupils of the National Institution of the Deaf-Mute of Paris. He died on 10 March 1943 and was buried in Vendôme.

== Notable works ==
- Monument au maréchal de Rochambeau, 1901.
- Allégorie américaine, 1902.
- Le Triomphe de la Vérité, 1905.
- Diane chasseresse, 1908.
- La Fortune et le Travail, 1909.
- Galanterie, 1914.
- L’Ombre du souvenir, 1925.
- Médaillon de 3 mètres de diamètre, 1937.

== Distinctions and awards ==
- Déco Chevalier de la Légion d'honneur.
- Déco Officier de l'Ordre des Palmes académiques en 1900.
- Une médaille à l'Exposition Universelle (1900).
- Une médaille au Salon.
- Grand prix d'honneur à l'exposition d’Athènes en 1928.
