= Woodward & Lothrop Service Warehouse =

- U.S. National Register of Historic Places
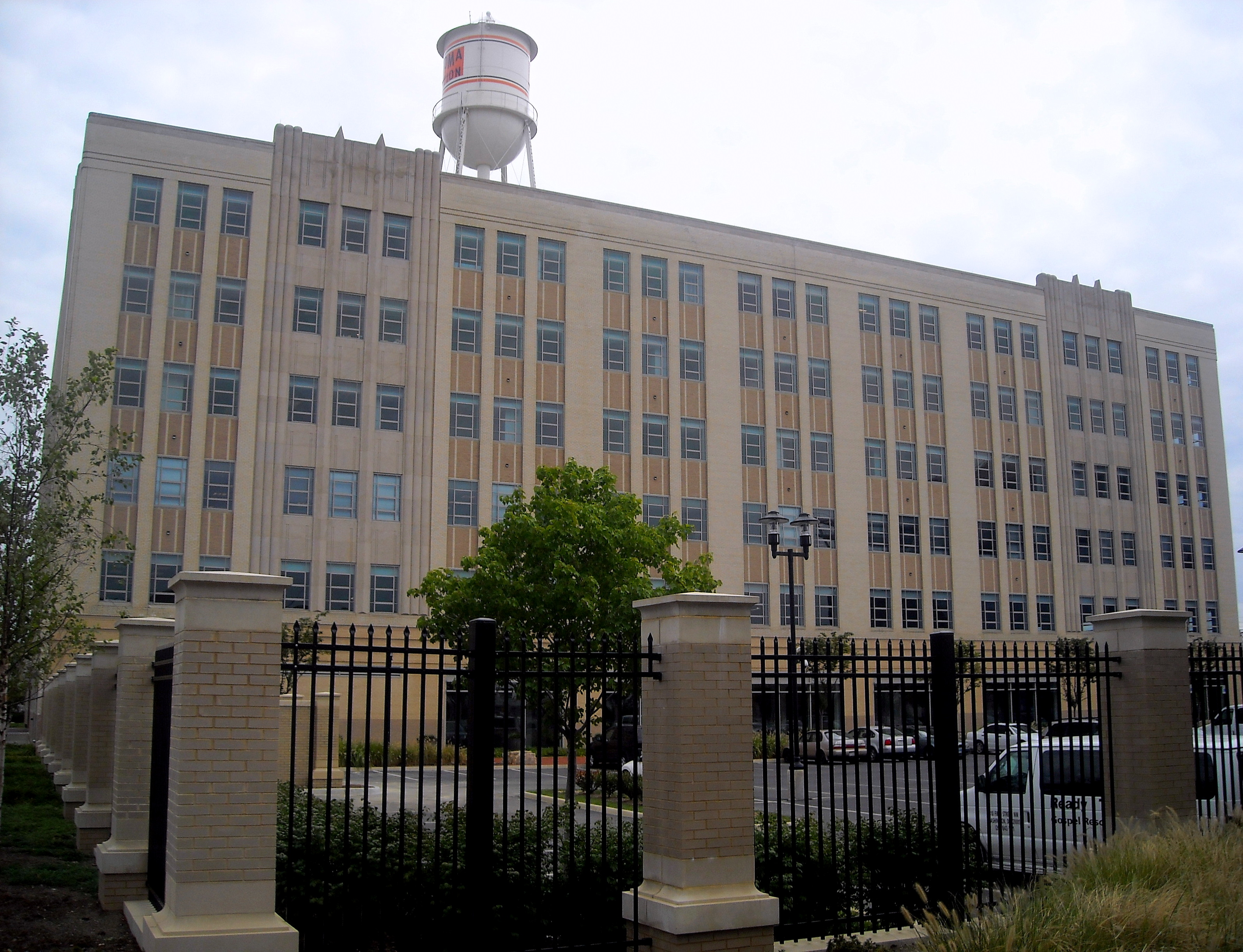
- Woodward & Lothrop Service Warehouse in 2008

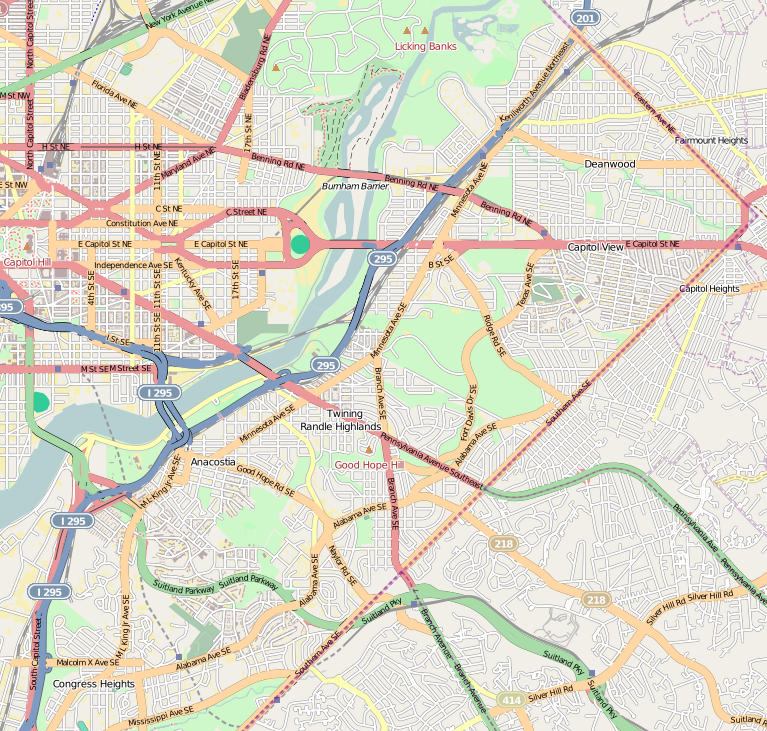
- Location within Washington, D.C. Location within the District of Columbia Location within the United States
- Location: 131 M Street, NE Washington, D.C.
- Coordinates: 38°54′19.6669″N 77°0′18.0684″W
- Built: 1937–39
- Architect: Abbott, Merkt & Company
- Architectural style: Streamline Moderne
- NRHP reference No.: 05000046
- Added to NRHP: February 15, 2005

The Woodward & Lothrop Service Warehouse is a historic warehouse located in the NoMa neighborhood of Washington, D.C. It was designated a District of Columbia Historic Landmark in 1993, and was added to the National Register of Historic Places in 2005. The building is visible from the NoMa–Gallaudet U Metro station.

== History ==
The warehouse was designed by Abbot, Merkt & Company, a group of architects noted for their work in designing warehouses, and was constructed between 1937 and 1939. Built to incorporate areas for service, storage, and delivery, it is one of the few examples of such a mixed-use warehouse still extant in the Washington area. The structure is considered to be the most ambitious warehouse built in the area before World War II, and is one of the city's largest warehouses. The property was owned by Woodward & Lothrop until the company foundered in 1995. It was subsequently taken over by the Bristol Group, a San Francisco-based company, and converted to office space. Tenants include the Equal Employment Opportunity Commission, the Bureau of Alcohol, Tobacco, Firearms and Explosives, United States Citizenship and Immigration Services, the United States Department of Homeland Security, and the United States Department of Veterans Affairs.

== Architecture ==
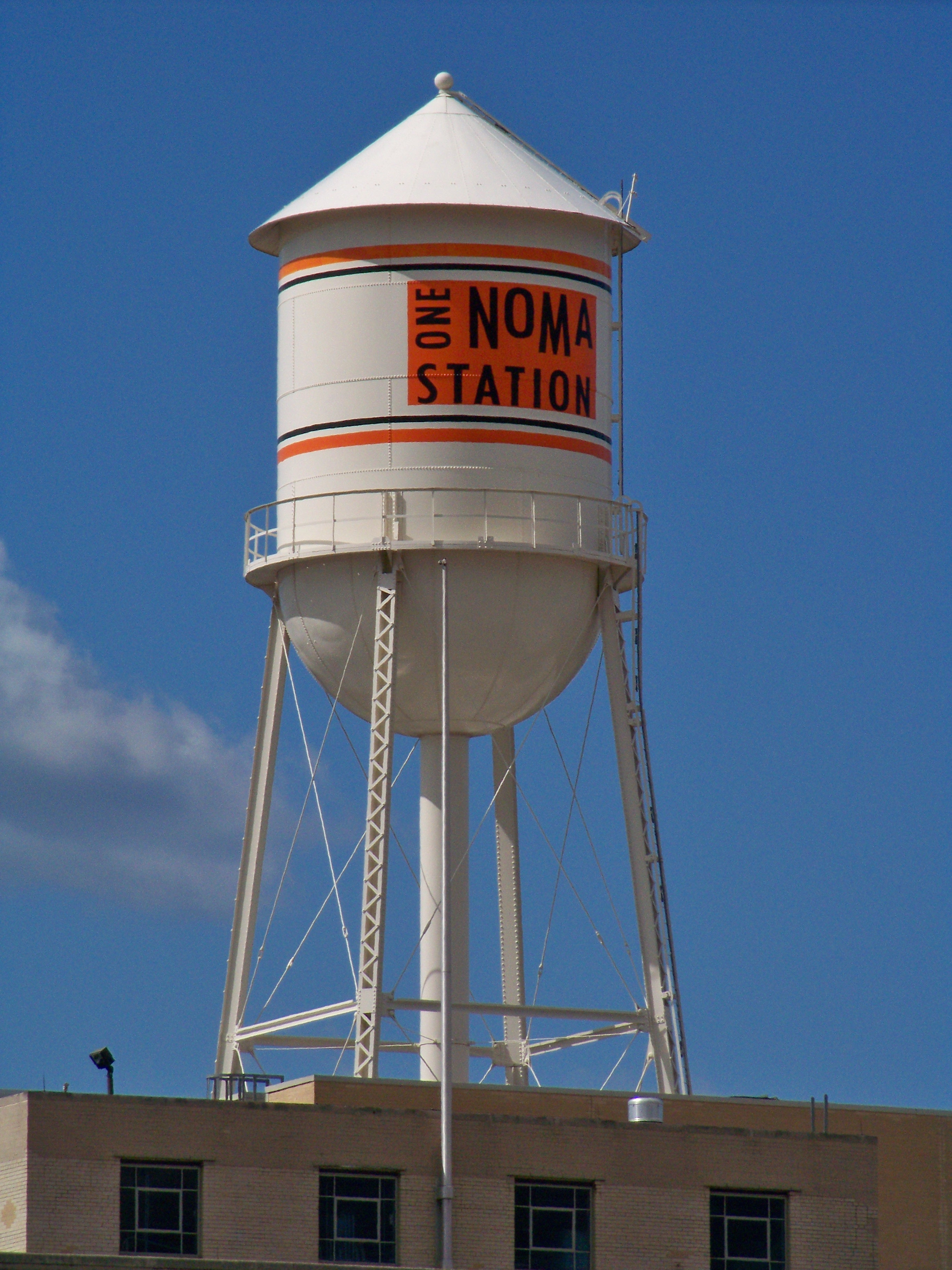
Tower on the roof

Architecturally, the building is considered notable because it was constructed in the Streamline Moderne style; unusually for a warehouse, its design was not meant to be merely utilitarian. According to the District's Historic Preservation Office, it was this "highly refined architectural expression unusual for [a] utilitarian structure" that led, in part, to its recognition as a historic structure.

One of the most prominent features of the building is its large pink neon sign, identifying it as a Woodward & Lothrop property, which remains on the building's exterior. There are no plans to remove the sign, as it is considered an integral part of the building's historic nature.

Along with the Lothrop Mansion, the warehouse is one of two D.C. Historic Landmarks directly associated with now-defunct department store chain Woodward & Lothrop.

== See also ==
- National Register of Historic Places listings in Washington, D.C.
- Hecht Company Warehouse
