= Paul-François Choppin =

French sculptor

Paul-François Choppin, born in Auteuil on 26 February 1856 and died in Paris (14th arrondissement) on 13 June 1937, was a French sculptor.

== Biography ==
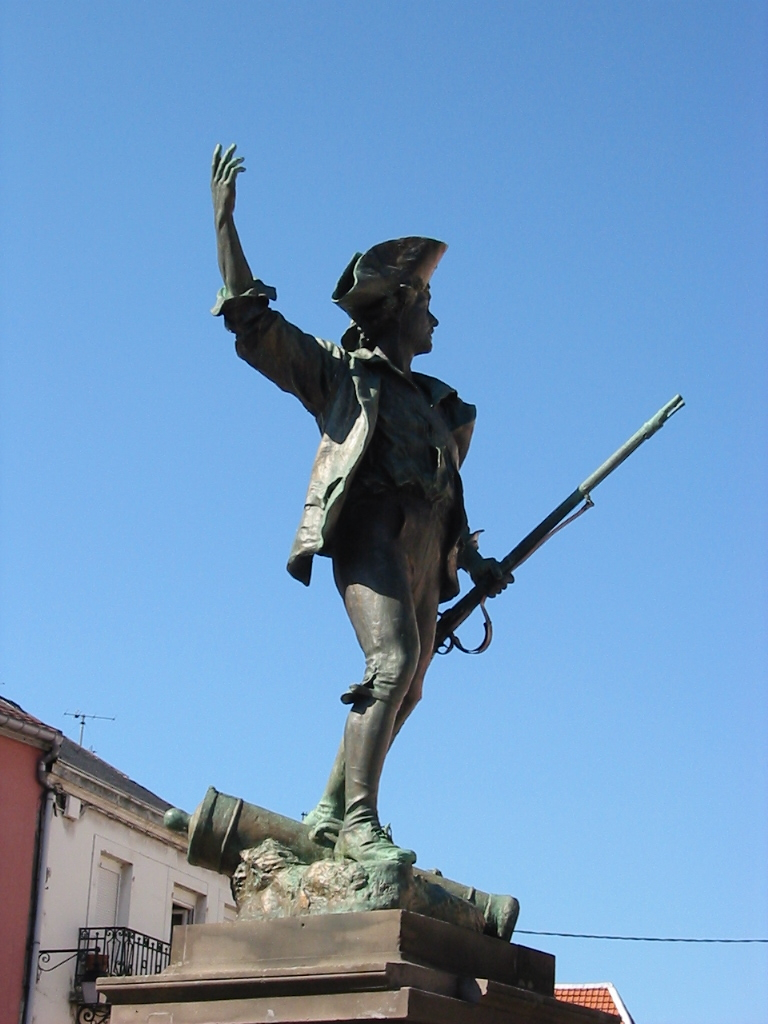
Le Volontaire de 1792 (1899), Remiremont.

He lost his hearing at the age of two and remained deaf and mute throughout his life. He studied at the National Institution for deaf-mutes in Paris, at the National School of Decorative Arts and then at the National School of Fine Arts. In 1904, he married Marie Célina Reuché, a miniaturist painter. A pupil of François Jouffroy and Alexandre Falguière, he started at the Salon des Artistes Français in 1877, of which he became a member in 1886. He presented his Volunteer project three times at the Salon, first in 1888 under the title A winner of the Bastille, then at the Universal Exhibition of 1889: A Volunteer of 92, and finally in 1898: A Enrolled in 1792. Choppin exhibited at the Salon until 1923. In 1886 he obtained an honorable mention, then a silver medal in 1888 and he received a bronze medal at the Exposition Universelle (1889).

Choppin worked as an art teacher in Paris, where the deaf artist Douglas Tilden was his pupil in the late 1880s.

== Works ==
- 1920, Bust of Gustave Baguer, Asnières-sur-Seine, Institut Baguer.
- Le Génie des arts, 1886, plaster statue bought by the State and deposited in 1895, Musée Sainte-Croix in Poitiers, work destroyed.
- Monument to Paul Broca, 1887. Erected in Paris, Place Henri-Mondor, it was sent to be melted down during the Occupation.
- Monument to Paul Broca, erected in the birthplace of the doctor in Sainte-Foy-la-Grande, it was also sent to the cast under the Vichy regime under the Occupation.
- The Volunteer of 1792, 1899, bronze statue erected in Remiremont on the initiative of Jules Méline then president of the council. Another copy, erected in Paris, square Parmentier, was sent for melting in 1942. * The museums of fine arts of Reims and the French Revolution each keep a 54 cm bronze statue of this subject.
- The Death of Britannicus, Dieppe, Château de Dieppe.

=== Bibliography ===
- Auguste Boyer, Paul Choppin, artiste sculpteur sourd-muet, Paris, Atelier typographique de l'institution nationale des sourds-muets, 1909.
