= C.C. Dasham and Jeb Alexander =

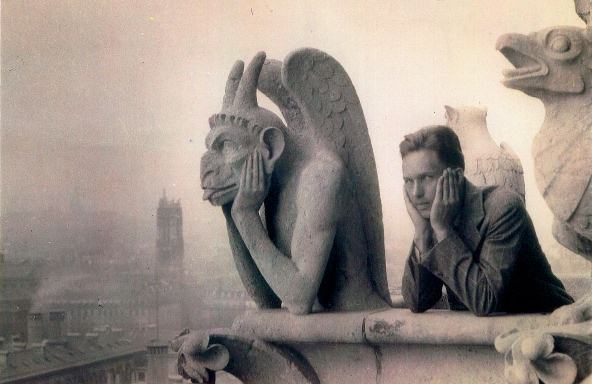
C.C. Dasham, ca. 1939

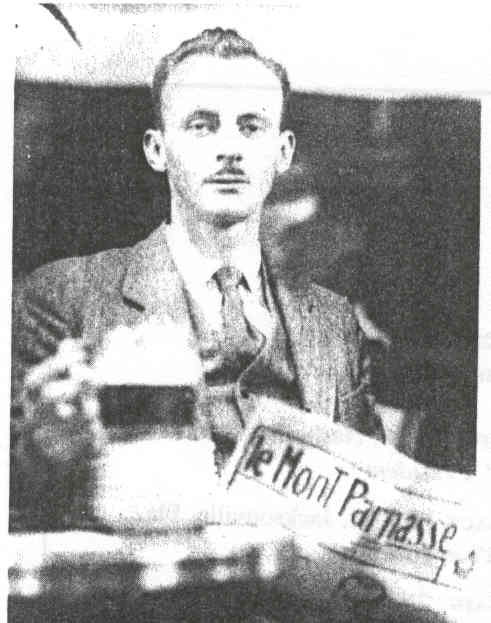
Jeb Alexander, ca. 1939

C.C. Dasham and Jeb Alexander are the pseudonyms of Isham W. Perkins (January 30, 1900 – June 15, 1976) and Carter Newman Bealer (October 17, 1899 – May 11, 1965) whose lives are recounted in Jeb and Dash: A Diary of Gay Life 1918–1945, the diaries of Carter Newman Bealer edited by his niece Ina Russell. Another book, Carter & Isham: In a Colorado Canyon: A Companion Volume to Ina Russell's Jeb and Dash, was edited by Neal Cordan.

== Early lives ==
Carter Newman Bealer (pseud. "Jeb") was born on October 17, 1899, in Atlanta, Georgia, the son of Pierre McFarland Bealer (1867–1954) and Alba Happy Newman (1872–1904).

In 1908 Carter Bealer moved to Washington, D.C., with his family. He attended Central High School. From 1918 to 1922 he attended Washington and Lee University, Lexington, Virginia, where in 1919 he met Isham W. Perkins (pseud. "Dash"). In 1927 Bealer graduated from George Washington University, Washington, D.C.

Isham W. Perkins ("Dash") was born on January 30, 1900, in Henderson, Tennessee, the son of George N. Perkins (1862–1933) and Elizabeth Ada Purdy (1864–1937). Perkins moved with his family to St. Petersburg, Florida, where he attended high school. He graduated from the Memphis State Teachers College in Memphis, Tennessee.

== Careers ==
At the beginning of the 1920s, Perkins moved to Detroit, Michigan, and worked for the Metropolitan Life Insurance Co. In 1925 he moved to Washington, D.C., and took a position as librarian, first at the Department of Agriculture and later at the Department of State. He also worked for the U. S. Book Exchange at the Library of Congress. In 1955 he began work at the Dumbarton Oaks Library. He retired in 1967.

Bealer worked as proofreader and editor at the Government Printing Office, Washington, D.C. From 1912 to 1964, one year before his death, he kept diaries chronicling his life and his relationship with Perkins.

Their jobs in the government bureaucracy field of Washington, D.C., make their relationship notable, due to the risks they faced to carry it on.

== Personal lives ==
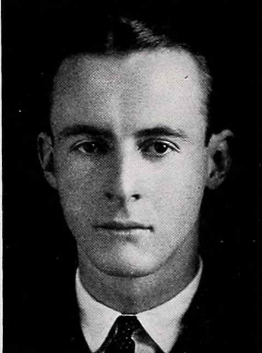
Jeb Alexander, 1922

While at Washington and Lee University, Perkins had another boyfriend, "Harry Agneau" (pseudonym of Rutherford Roland Hall), who died by suicide when he and Perkins were expelled due to their relationship being unveiled. In that period, Bealer's boyfriend was "Randall Hare", a married man.

Bealer and Perkins took a trip to France at the outbreak of World War II.

Bealer died on May 11, 1965, in Washington, D.C., and is buried at Fort Lincoln Cemetery, Brentwood, Maryland. He left his large collection of books to the Washington and Lee Library.

Perkins died on June 15, 1976, in Boca Raton, Florida, and is buried at Henderson City Cemetery, Tennessee.
