= Lansburgh's =

American store chain in Washington, D.C.

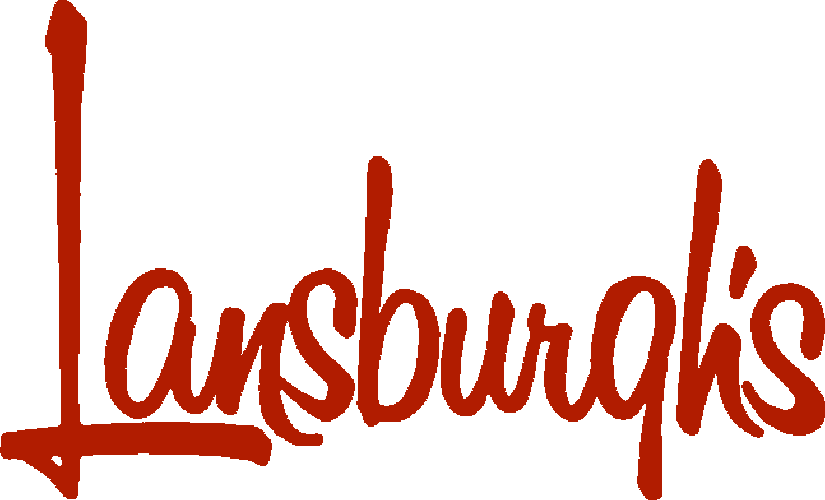

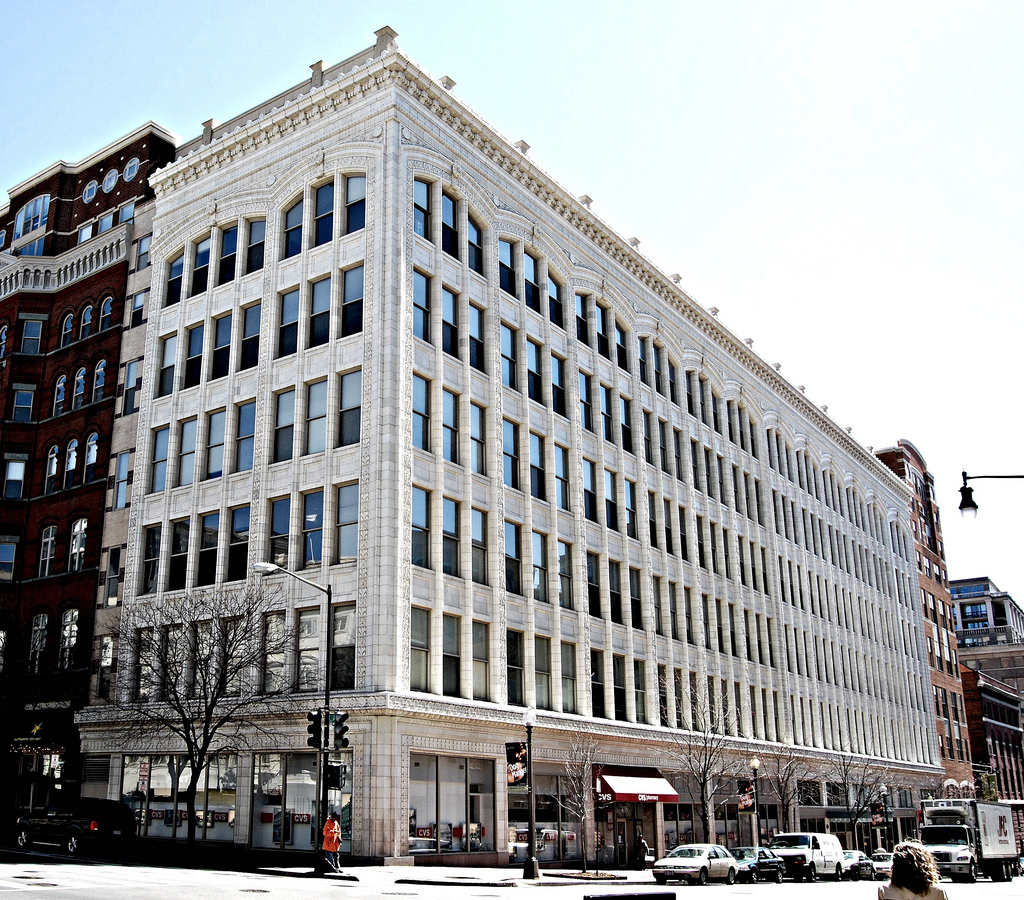
- Former Downtown Washington, D.C. flagship store addition (built 1916–24)
- Industry: Retail
- Founded: 1860
- Defunct: 1973
- Fate: Liquidation
- Headquarters: Washington, D.C.
- Products: General Merchandise
- Parent: City Stores, Inc.

Lansburgh's was a chain of department stores located in the Washington, D.C. area. The clientele were middle-income consumers.

== History ==
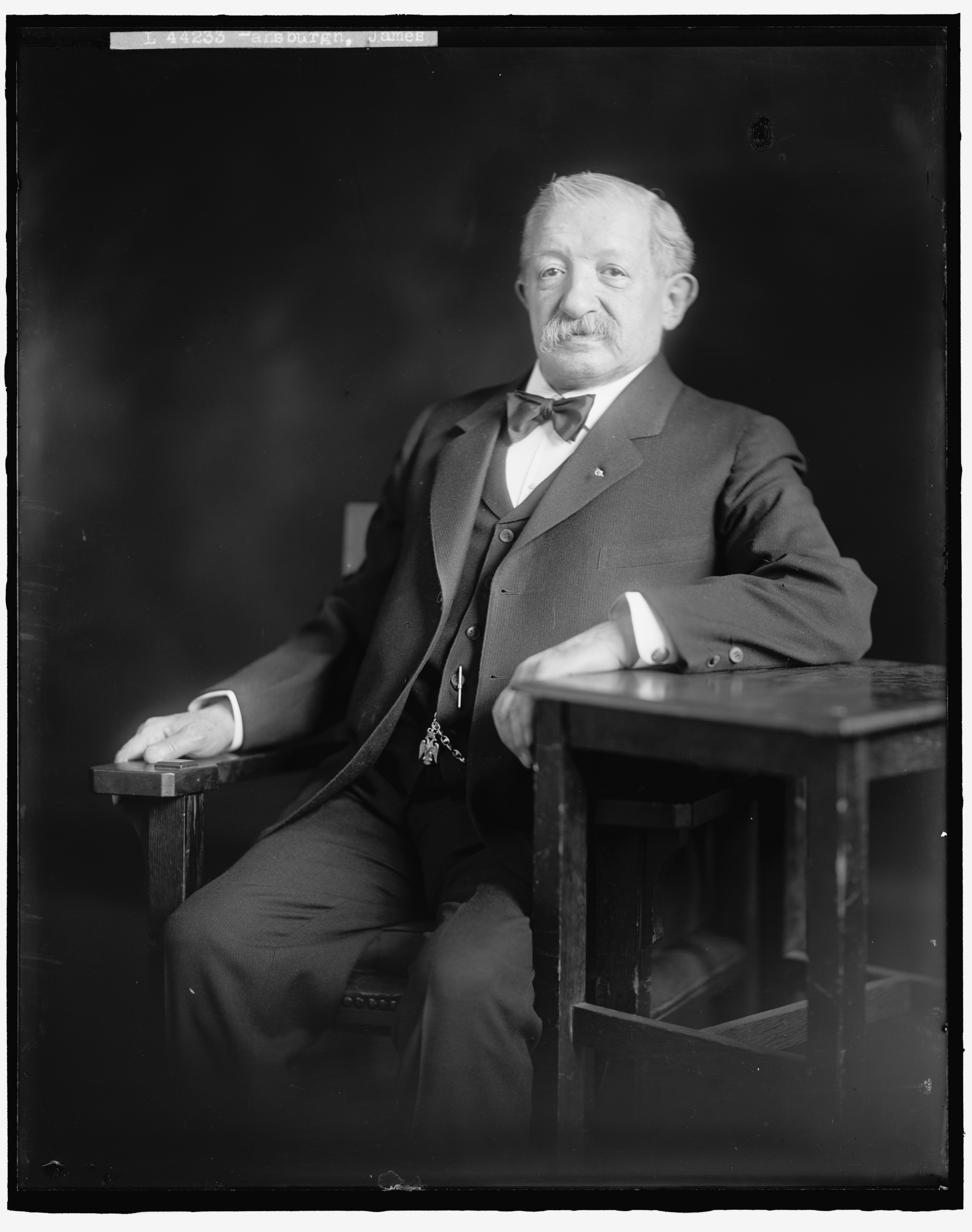
James Lansburgh in 1905

The first store, at 7th and E Streets, NW, in Washington, D.C.'s downtown shopping district, opened on October 30, 1860. The founders were James and Gustav Lansburgh. The company was known initially for supplying the black crepe used for the funeral of President Abraham Lincoln. Lansburgh's installed the first elevator (wooden) in a commercial building in the District of Columbia. The company remained family owned until its acquisition by City Stores, Inc. in 1951. At the time of its final liquidation in June 1973, the chain ranked eighth in the Washington D.C. retail market, with sales of $28.5 million.

== Flagship store ==
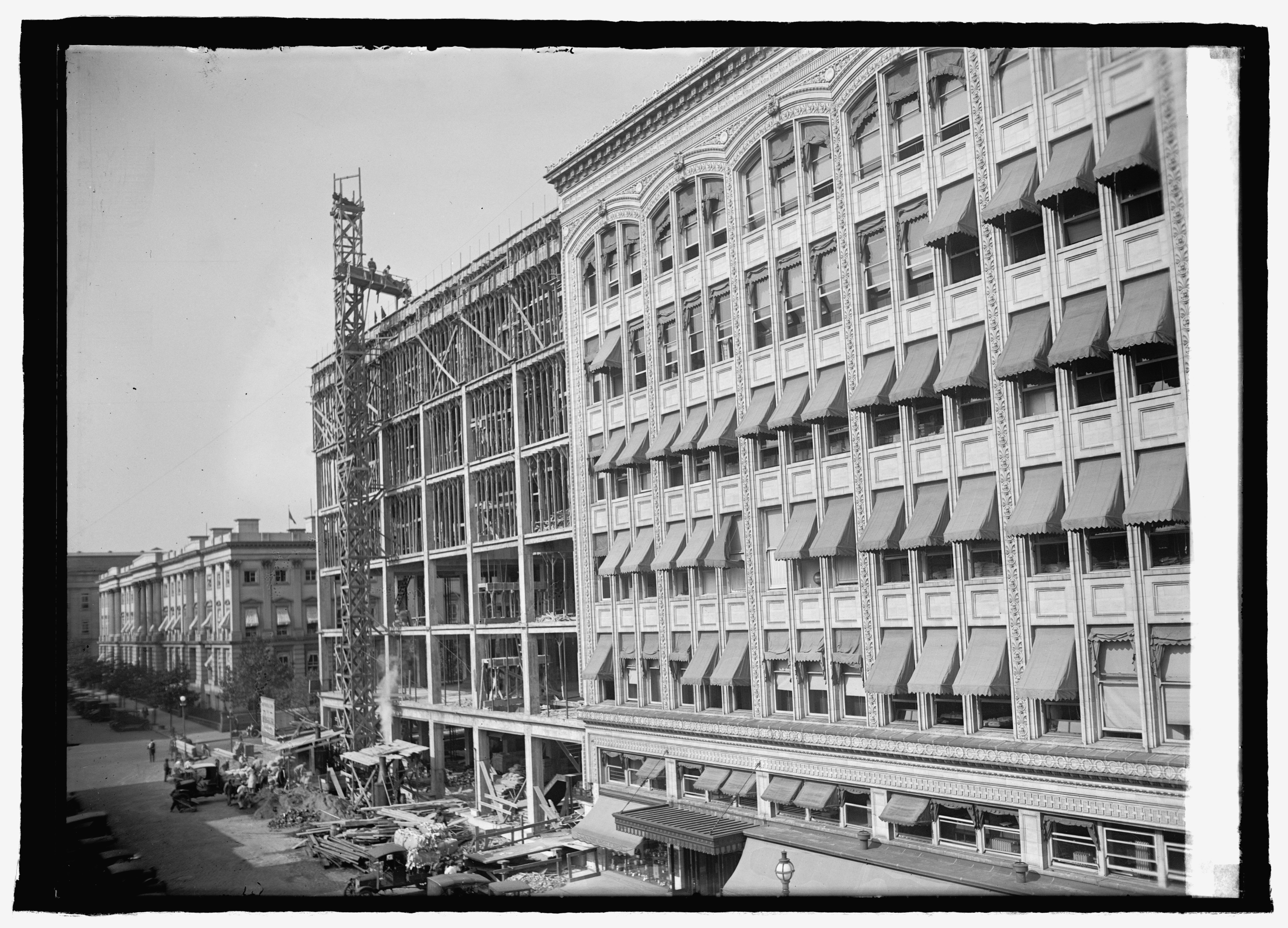
Construction of the flagship store, 1924

The initial Seventh Street flagship downtown store was located on and constructed in 1882, and was a work of architect Adolf Cluss. The store was greatly expanded in 1916, 1924 and 1941 out to Eighth Street. During the 1970s and 1980s, the store building was used for offices and warehouse space. The former flagship store on 7th Street was at the forefront of the revitalized Penn Quarter section of downtown Washington, D.C.

== Branch stores ==
In 1955, Lansburgh's opened its first suburban branch at Langley Park, Maryland. It was followed, in 1959, by a $2.5 million, 150,000-square-foot (14,000 m^{2}) branch at Shirlington Shopping Center in Arlington, Virginia. The chain was slow to open other suburban branches. The 160,000-square-foot (15,000 m^{2}) store at Tysons Corner Center opened on October 19, 1969, after protracted battles regarding leases dating back to 1962. Because of that fight, the chain was slow to expand to other malls opening the Washington, D.C. suburbs. This was followed by the store at Rockville Mall on February 14, 1972, and a 160,000-square-foot (15,000 m^{2}) store at Springfield Mall (later Korvettes, then SpringFest Food Court/AMC) in March 1973.
