= Harvey L. Page =

American architect

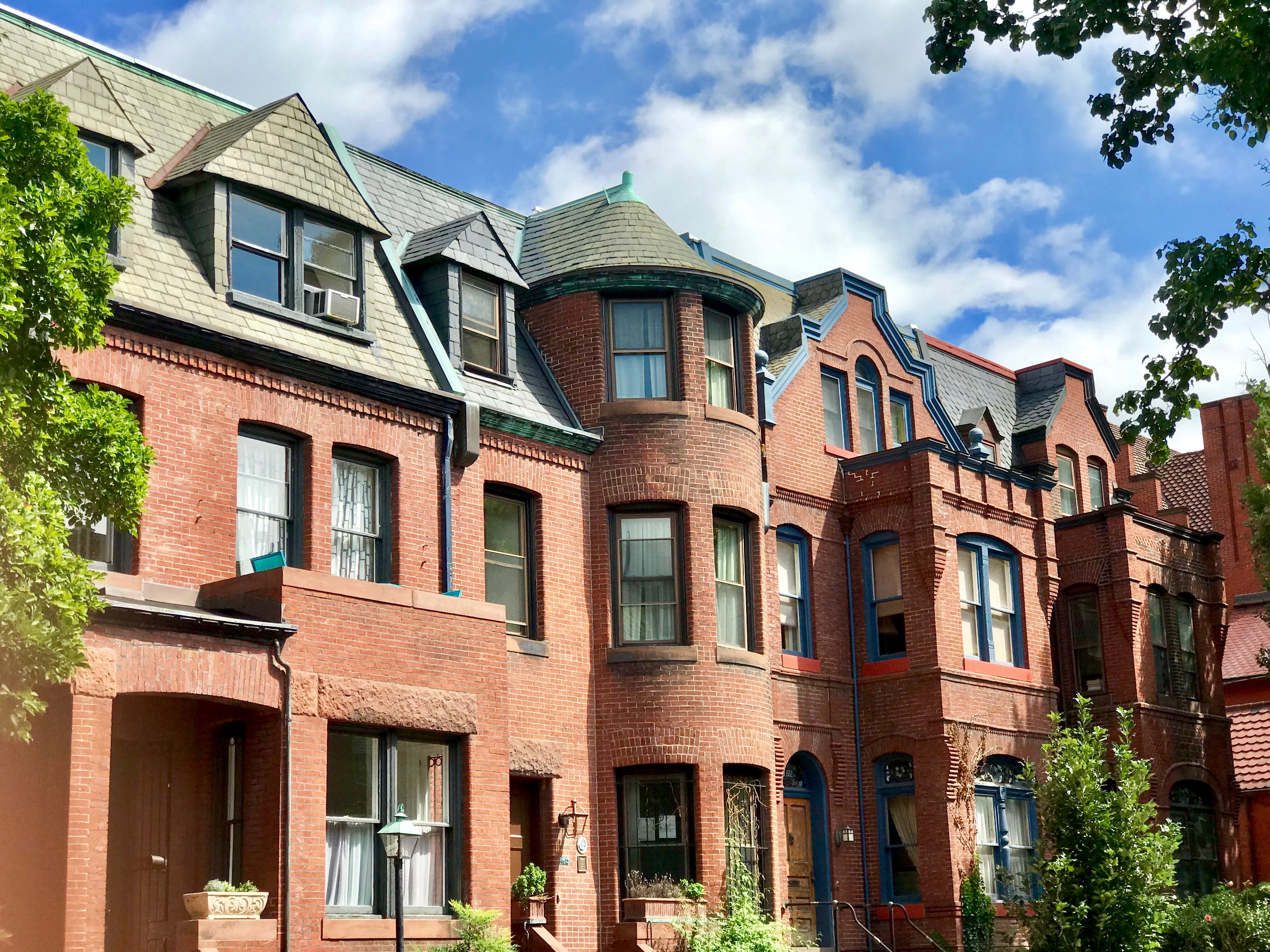
Row homes on the Harvey L. Page block in the Dupont Circle neighborhood

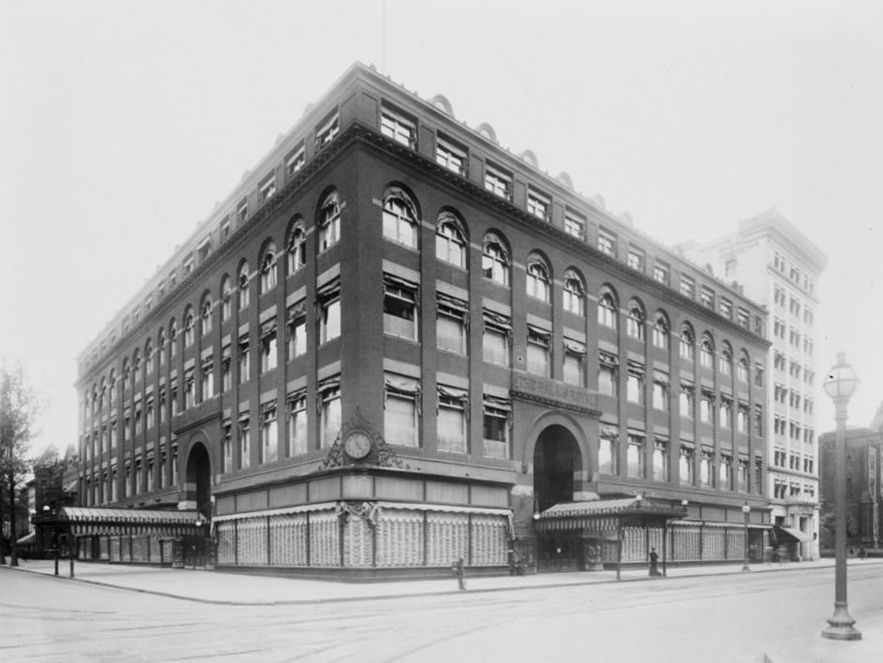
Palais Royal department store at 11th and G streets NW, Washington, D.C.

Harvey Lindsley Page (January 9, 1859 – January 5, 1934) was an American architect who built many well known structures in Washington, D.C., and San Antonio, Texas.

== Early life ==
Page was born in Washington, D.C., on January 9, 1859, and was the son of Charles Grafton Page and Priscilla (née Webster) Page. His father was an inventor who discovered the induction coil and the circuit breaker.

Page attended school in Andover, Massachusetts, and then at the Emerson Institute in Washington, D.C.

== Career ==
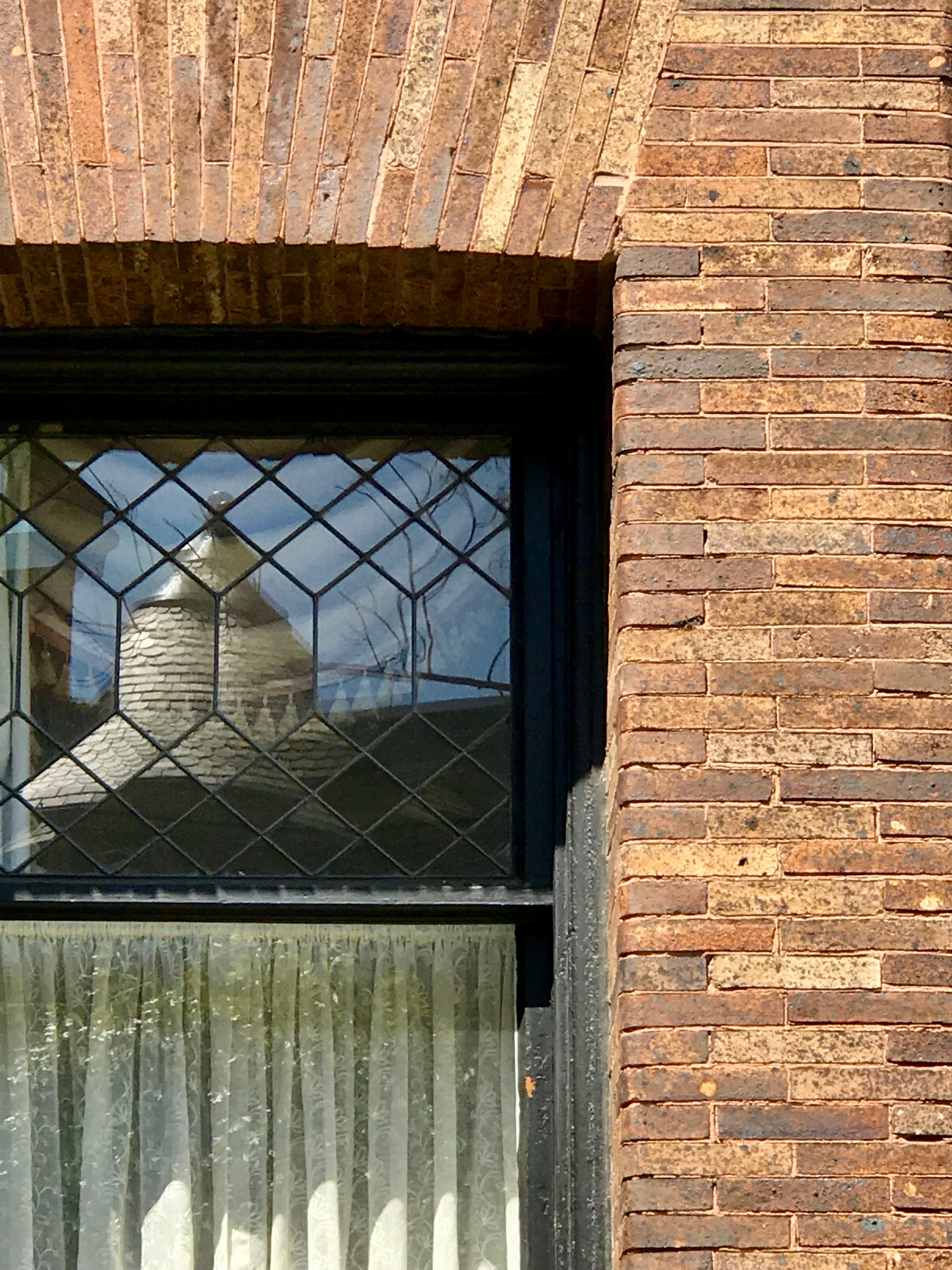
Brickwork and leadlight, Whittemore House, Dupont Circle, Washington, DC

Page studied architecture with J. L. Smithmeyer. He formed a partnership with W. Bruce Gray in 1878, and their first known commission of record was in 1880, when they were commissioned to design a house at the corner of Massachusetts Avenue and 18th Street for Belden Noble. Harper's Magazine reported in 1882 that the Nobel house was "perhaps the best illustration in the city of what may be accomplished in massiveness and the ornament in brick, without superficial adornment." It was demolished in 1915, and became the fashionable McCormick Apartment building. Among Page's well-known works around Washington are the Army and Navy Club, the Metropolitan Club, the Phoebe Hearst House, the Whittemore House and the row homes on the Harvey L. Page Block. Page has been recognized by the D.C. Historic Preservation Office as "one of Washington's most innovative architects of the period."

=== Palais Royal ===
In 1893, Washington's upscale Palais Royal department store opened in a grand new building designed by Page.

In 1897, Page moved to Chicago, where he practiced with E. S. Hall at the H. L. Page and Company firm until approximately 1900. Around the year 1900, he moved to San Antonio, Texas, where he remained for the rest of his life.

=== The Hearst Mansion ===
In 1889, George and Phoebe Hearst, of the Hearst fortune, hired Page to reconfigure their home at 1400 New Hampshire Ave NW, just south of Dupont Circle, into a Romanesque Revival style. Phoebe Apperson Hearst lived there until 1902, after which it became the Italian Embassy until 1925. "Subsequently, it was used as a hotel, a club, the Russian Bible Society Headquarters (from 1948 to 1958), and the Cathedral Club Residence, until 1964, when it was demolished."

=== The Whittemore House ===
Page designed the Whittemore House located at 1526 New Hampshire Avenue in Washington's Dupont Circle neighborhood between 1892 and 1894. He built the house for opera singer Sarah Adams Whittemore and William C. Whittemore, her second husband. The National Register of Historic Places (NRHP) listing for Page's Whittemore House (now the Women's National Democratic Club) recognizes the architect as showing "restraint and fine craftsmanship" as well as "sympathy with the more advanced architectural thought of his day which favored integrity of materials, [and] simplicity of form ... rather than derivative Beaux Arts Classicism." As described by the Women's National Democratic Club: "A punched-and-tooled copper-covered oriel bay hangs over the New Hampshire Ave. entrance, its dull patina a complement to the richly mottled Roman Brick. The brick is unique, taken from a small rare clay deposit in New Jersey that can never be produced again. Doors and leaded glass windows are set deeply into brick walls without additional ornamentation. Variety is achieved from subtle variations in the finely crafted brickwork, producing flat rarely interrupted surfaces that are associated with the Shingle Style. The flat walls meet to form angular towers and bays in the asymmetrical facades of the house. The flowing cape-like curves of the high roof covering the polygonal towers, bays, and eyelike dormer windows recall a more organic building form, the thatched roof, but is instead constructed of English slate, outlined by handcrafted copper gutters."

=== The Harvey L. Page Block ===
A group of row homes on the 1600 block of Riggs Place NW, in the northeastern section of Dupont Circle, is the only remaining example of the architect's contribution to more modest residential forms in Washington, DC. These 16 homes, on what is known as the Harvey L. Page block, represent a rare well-preserved assemblage of late 19th century residential architecture and workmanship in the Dupont Circle Historic District. The particular historic value of this the block was highlighted when the National Park Service expanded the Dupont Circle Historic District in 1984. In arguing for the expansion, the D.C. Historic Preservation Office described the block as a "beautifully preserved enclave much praised for its original stained glass and brick and copper work." The front facades of the homes at the eastern end of the row have ornate angular roof lines typical of the Queen Anne style. Also notable are the copper-clad bays and Hummelstown stone trim from the Lebanon Valley in Pennsylvania. The eight houses between 1610 and 1618, and 1613 and 1617 were built beginning in April 1889. The five homes at the western end of the row (1634 to 1626) form a distinct unit and were built in 1893. They have essentially similar designs in the less ornate Romanesque Revival style, differing from each other only in terms of their front bays which alternate in shape between trapezoid, rectangular and oval. In October 2016, the District of Columbia Historic Preservation Review Board (HRPB) heard a dispute over the development of two row homes on the south side of the Harvey L. Page block. Noting the historic value of both front and rear views of the homes, HPRB decided that rear additions to the homes should be limited to one story. In testimony before the HPRB, architectural historian Eimily Eig stated that: "This group of row houses is one of the most intact groups in Dupont Circle. Designed by a master architect, its composition at both the front and rear walls represents a skilled understanding of proportion." In this context she also noted that "the rear elevation of the row houses presents a high quality of design that should remain visible to the public along 17th street and the much used rear alley, as well as continuing access to a view that has been in place since 1893."

=== San Antonio works ===
Page's most important works in San Antonio include the International and Great Northern Railroad Depot (1907), the Masonic Temple, the L. B. Clegg House, the Schutz House, the San Antonio Coliseum, the Travis Club Building, and Temple Beth-El (1927). He also designed the Corpus Christi Coliseum and the Nueces County Courthouse (1914). Page designed the station that was built by the International and Great Northern Railroad in 1907. He was influenced by the architecture of San Antonio's Spanish missions and built the station in this style. He called this building his "Taj Mahal".

=== Painting ===
Later in life, Page began to paint, encouraged by his friend Robert Jenkins Onderdonk. He painted many landscape paintings of the old missions and the countryside around San Antonio.

== Personal life ==
In 1902, Page married Anne T. Bower of New York. They had four children.

He had an active social life in San Antonio and was a member of the San Antonio Club, the Travis Club, the Chamber of Commerce, and the Masons.

Page died in San Antonio on January 5, 1934.
