= F Street and 7th Street shopping districts =

Historical American shopping districts

Coordinates: 38.89782°N 77.0218°W

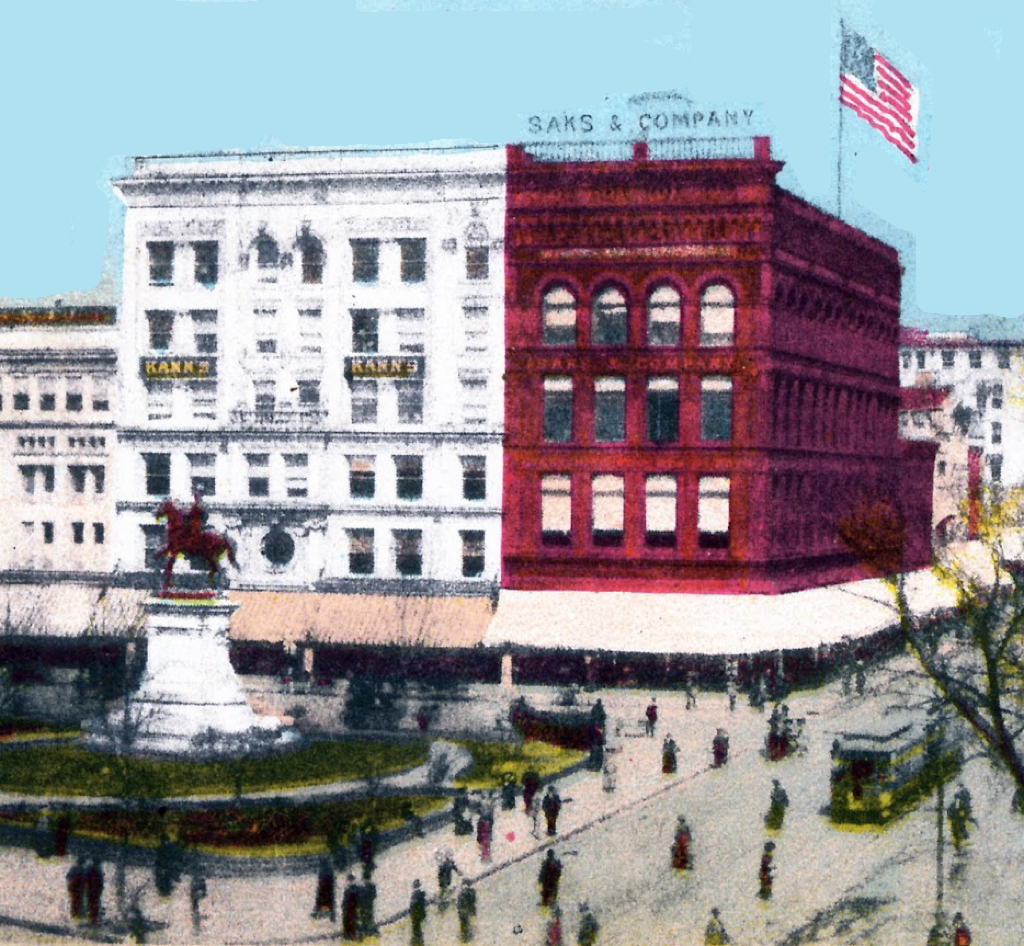
The demolished Saks and Company next to Kann's on the corner of Pennsylvania and 7th Streets, Northwest, Washington, D.C. in 1920; The Equestrian statue of Winfield Scott Hancock, in front, still exists in what is now United States Navy Memorial park.

Parts of F Street and 7th Street, N.W. and nearby blocks have historically been the heart of the Washington, D.C. Downtown shopping district. In the first half of the 20th century there were numerous upscale large department stores along and near F Street, while 7th Street housed more economical emporia and large retail furniture stores. The F street corridor stretches west from Downtown's Penn Quarter and Gallery Place towards 15th Street, while the 7th Street corridor includes the neighborhoods of Penn Quarter, Chinatown and Mount Vernon Square, and extends up to the border of Shaw.

== History ==
Center Market, the city's largest public market, opened in 1872, operating until 1931 on the site of today's National Archives Building. Its northern end faced Pennsylvania Avenue between 7th and 9th Streets. Transportation by Washington, D.C.'s streetcars, first horse-drawn, then electrified, notably the busy transfer point at F and 9th, helped solidify this area as D.C.'s most popular shopping district during that time.

== Current retail ==
Although Macy's is the only traditional department store left, the district is home to four discount department stores, three small malls or shopping centers, and many on-street retail stores, including H&M, Anthropologie, and others.

From north to south and east to west:

- From Gallery Pl. (G St.) to H St., from 6th to 7th, Gallery Place, a small urban power center with Bed, Bath & Beyond, Urban Outfitters, and Regal Cinemas
- On D from 8th to 9th, south side, site of the former Kann's department store (1893–1975); original store was on the NE corner of 8th and Market Space (now the north side of Navy Memorial plaza)
- On the block bounded by H, I, 9th and 10th streets, CityCenterDC shopping center, housing luxury boutiques (Hermès, etc.)
- On the block bounded by F, G, 10th and 11th streets, former flagship of the Woodward & Lothrop department store chain (1887–1996), reopened in 2003 and currently houses H&M, Forever 21 and Zara.
- On E from 11th to 12th, District Center with Nordstrom Rack and Saks Off Fifth discount department stores
- On F from 12th to 13th, north side, T.J. Maxx discount department store
- On G from 12th to 13th, north side, Macy's department store (was a Hecht's, built to replace the flagship, operated 1985–2006)
- On F from 13th to 14th, south side, Marshalls discount department store at The Shops at the National Press Building
- On Pennsylvania Avenue from 13th to 14th, The Shops at National Place, developed by The Rouse Co., formerly a small urban mall, now with a few retail shops. A food court which occupied a portion of The Shops, known as eat at National Place, shuttered in May 2020. The food court was developed by General Growth Properties, now a subsidiary of Brookfield Properties.

== Sites of department stores and other notable stores ==
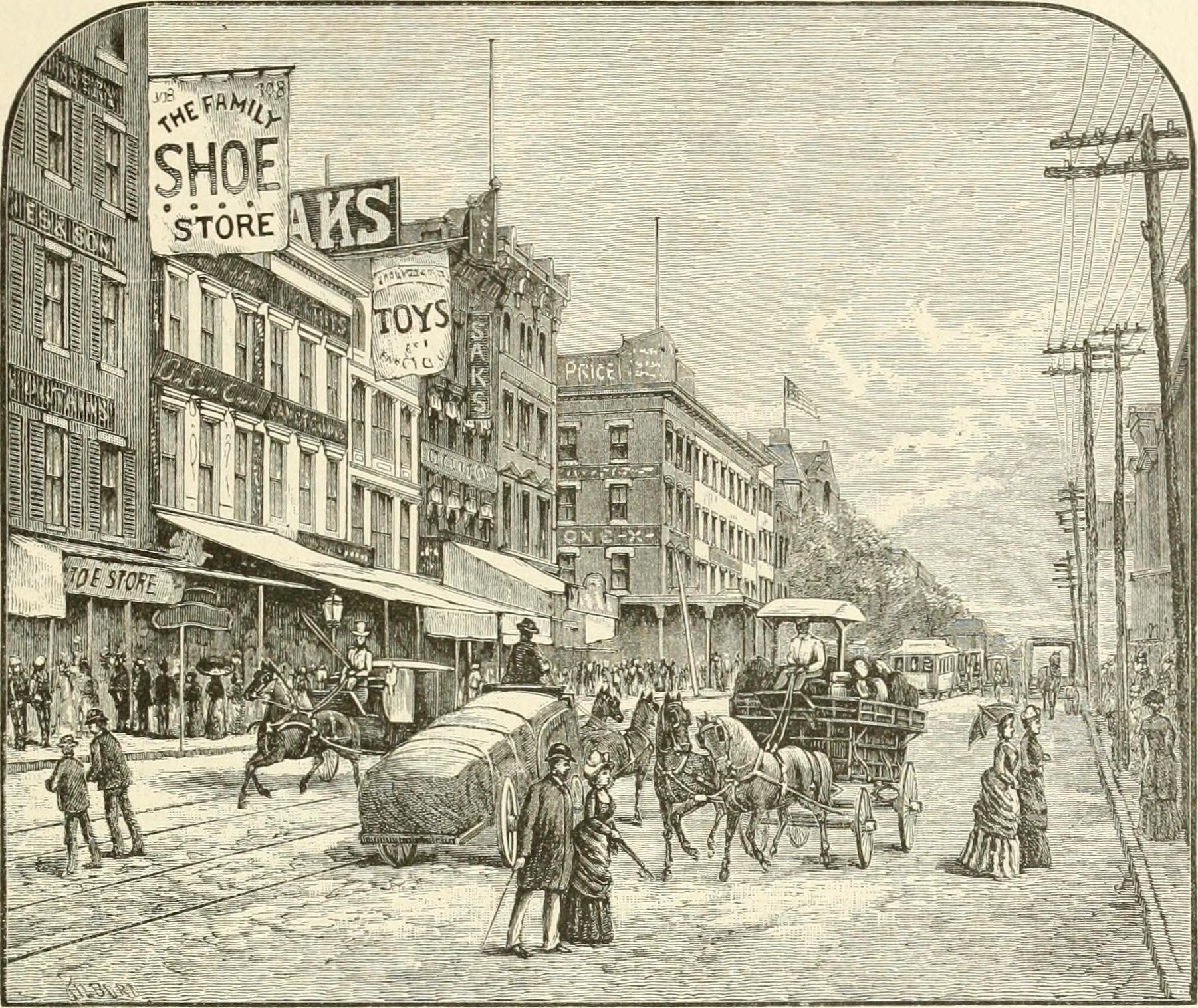
7th St., 1880s

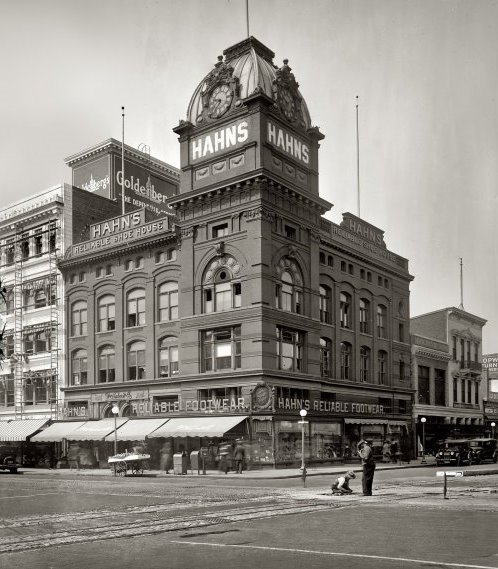
Hahn's Shoes, 7th at K

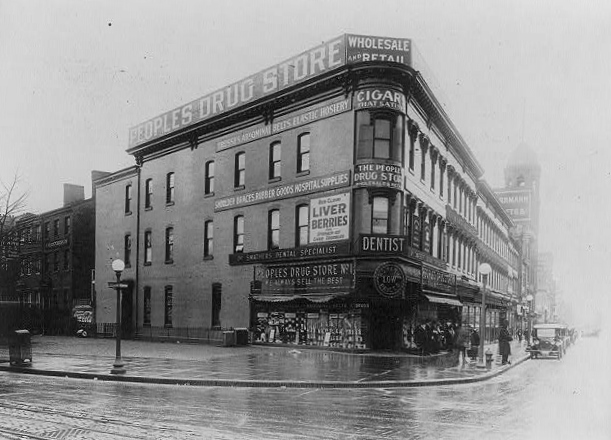
People's Drug Store #1, 7th at Massachusetts/K

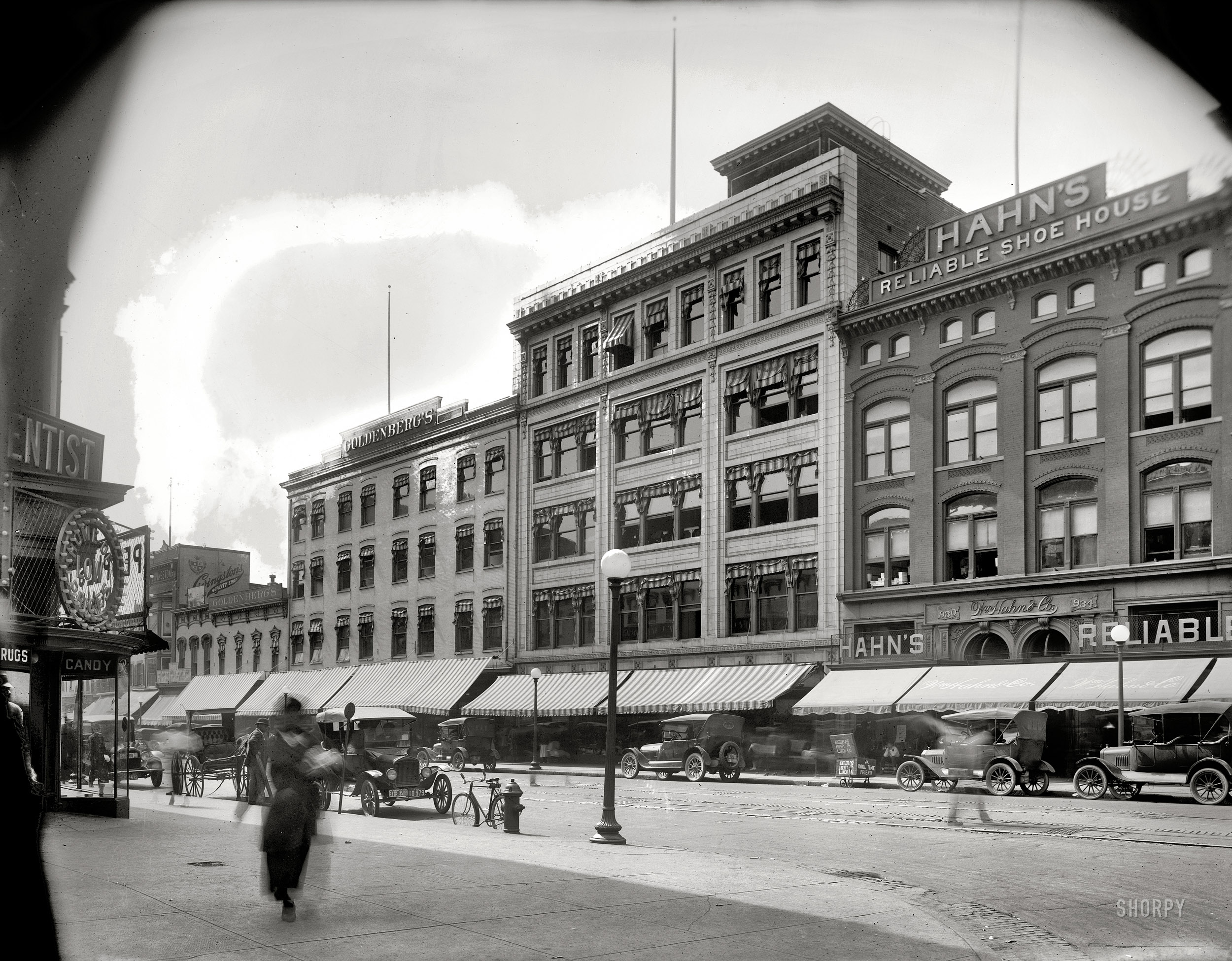
Goldenberg's, 7th south of K, c.1920

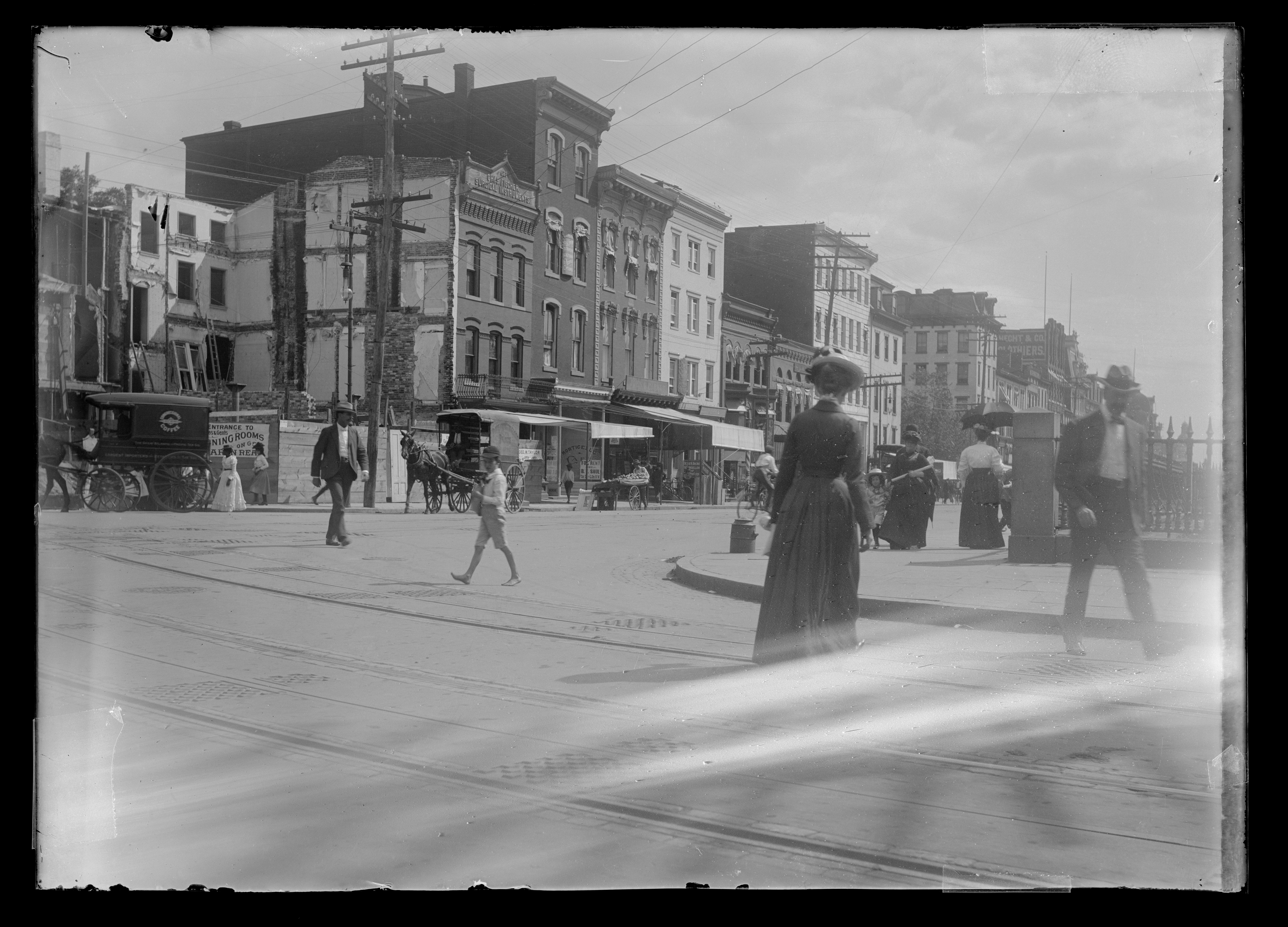
7th St. east side south from G, 1901

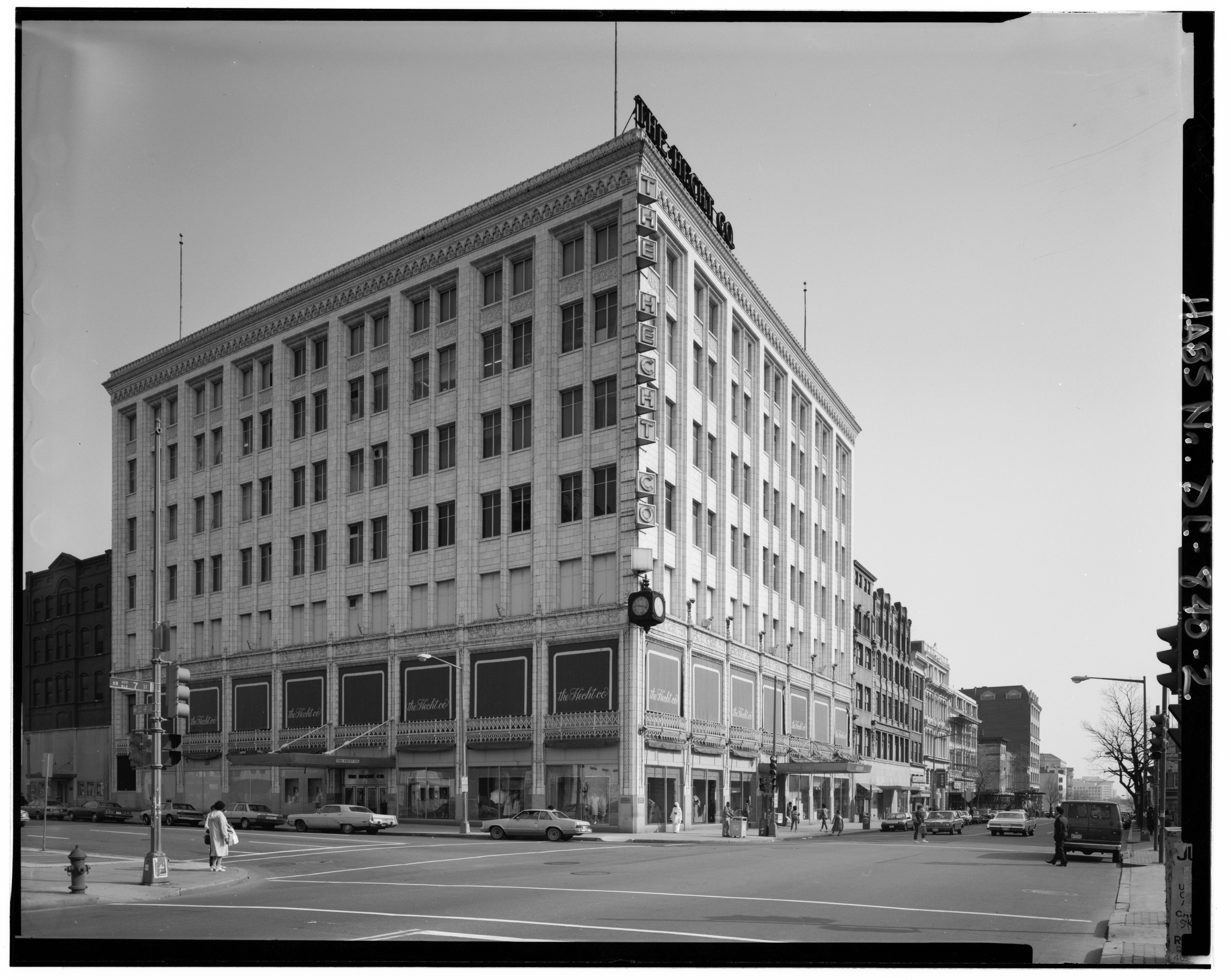
Hecht's, 7th and F (1924-1980s)

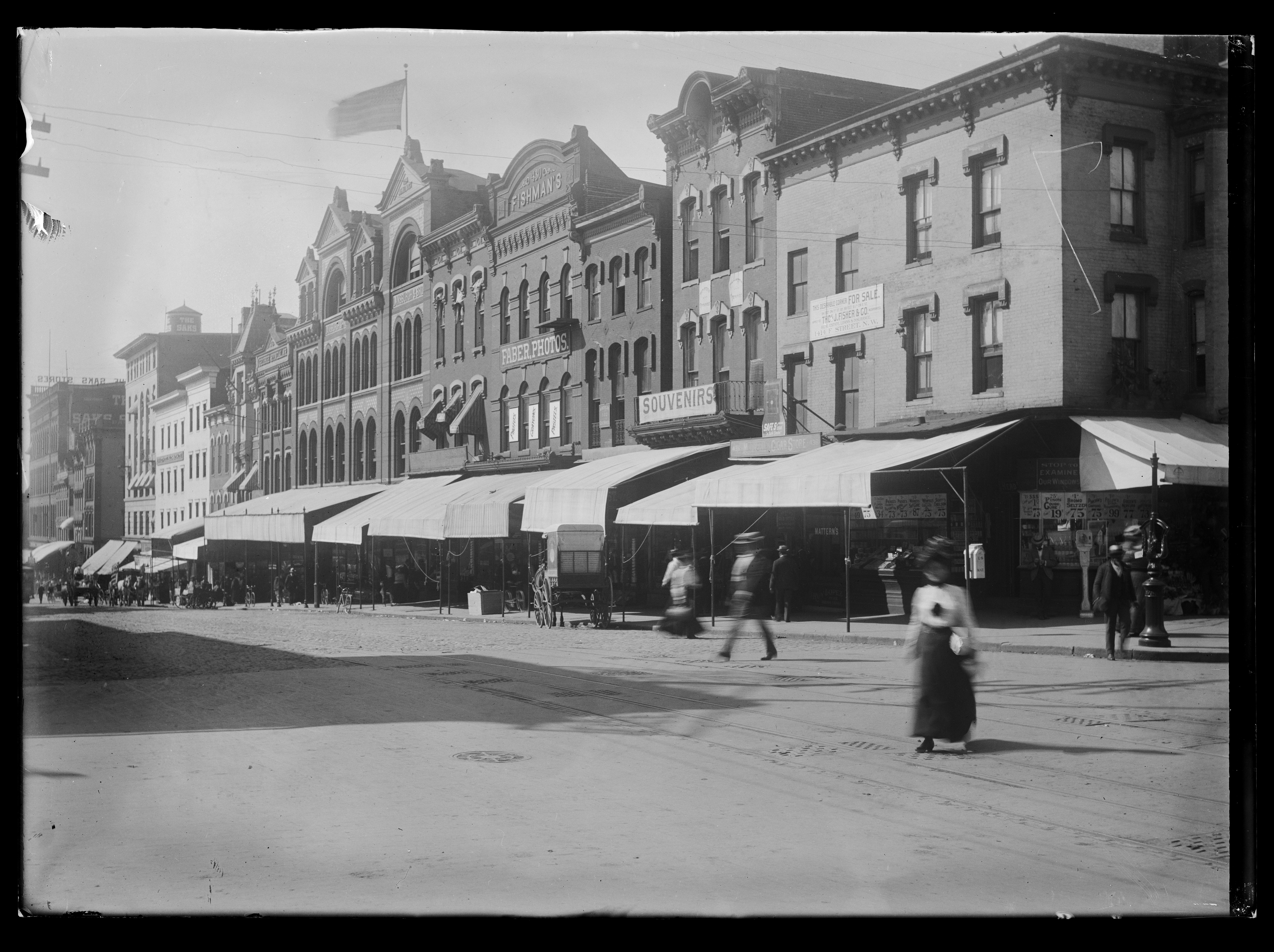
7th St., west side south from E, 1901

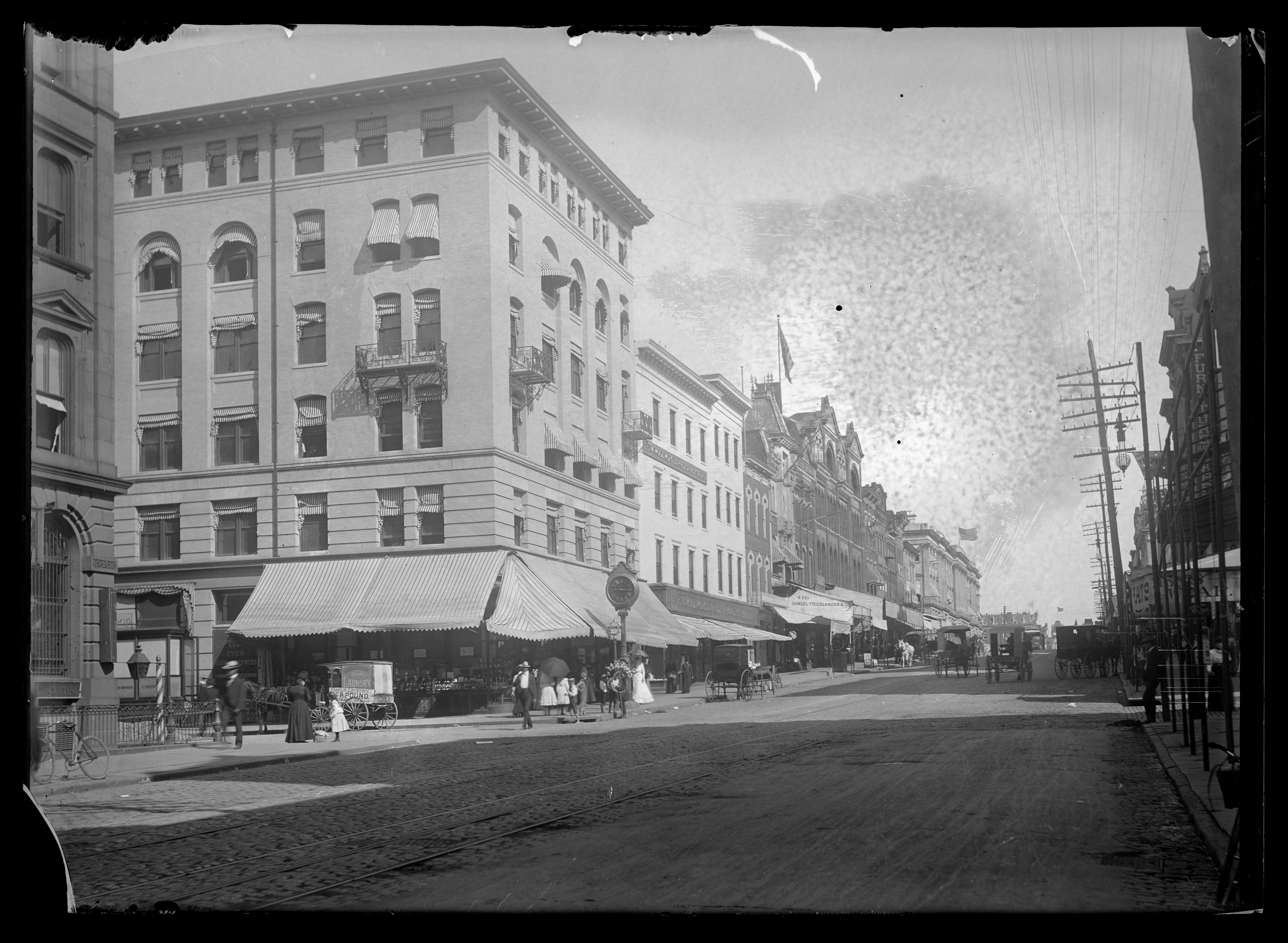
7th St. west side north from D, 1901

The Hub, 7th and D, 1980s

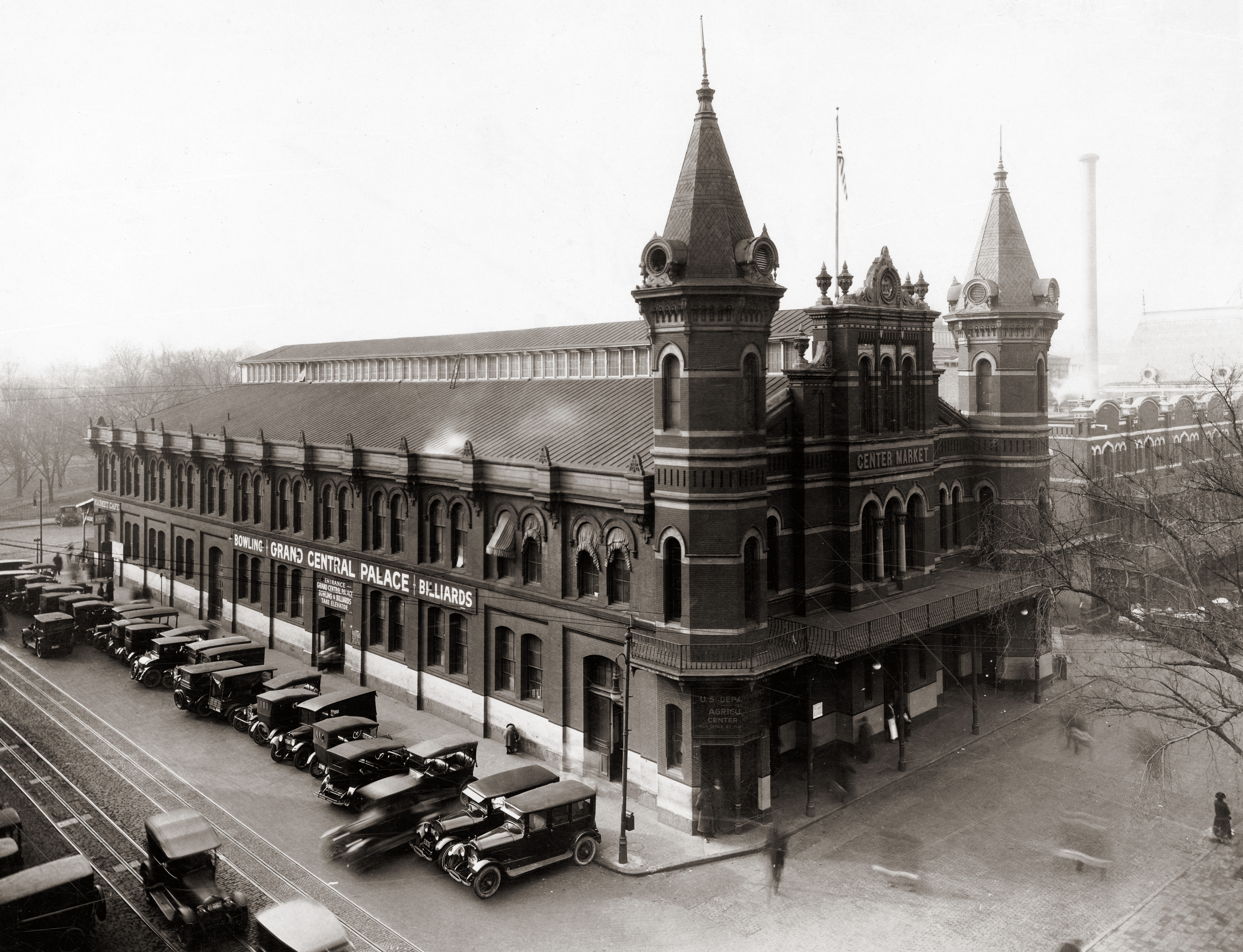
Center Market (1872-1931) at 7th and Pennsylvania Av.

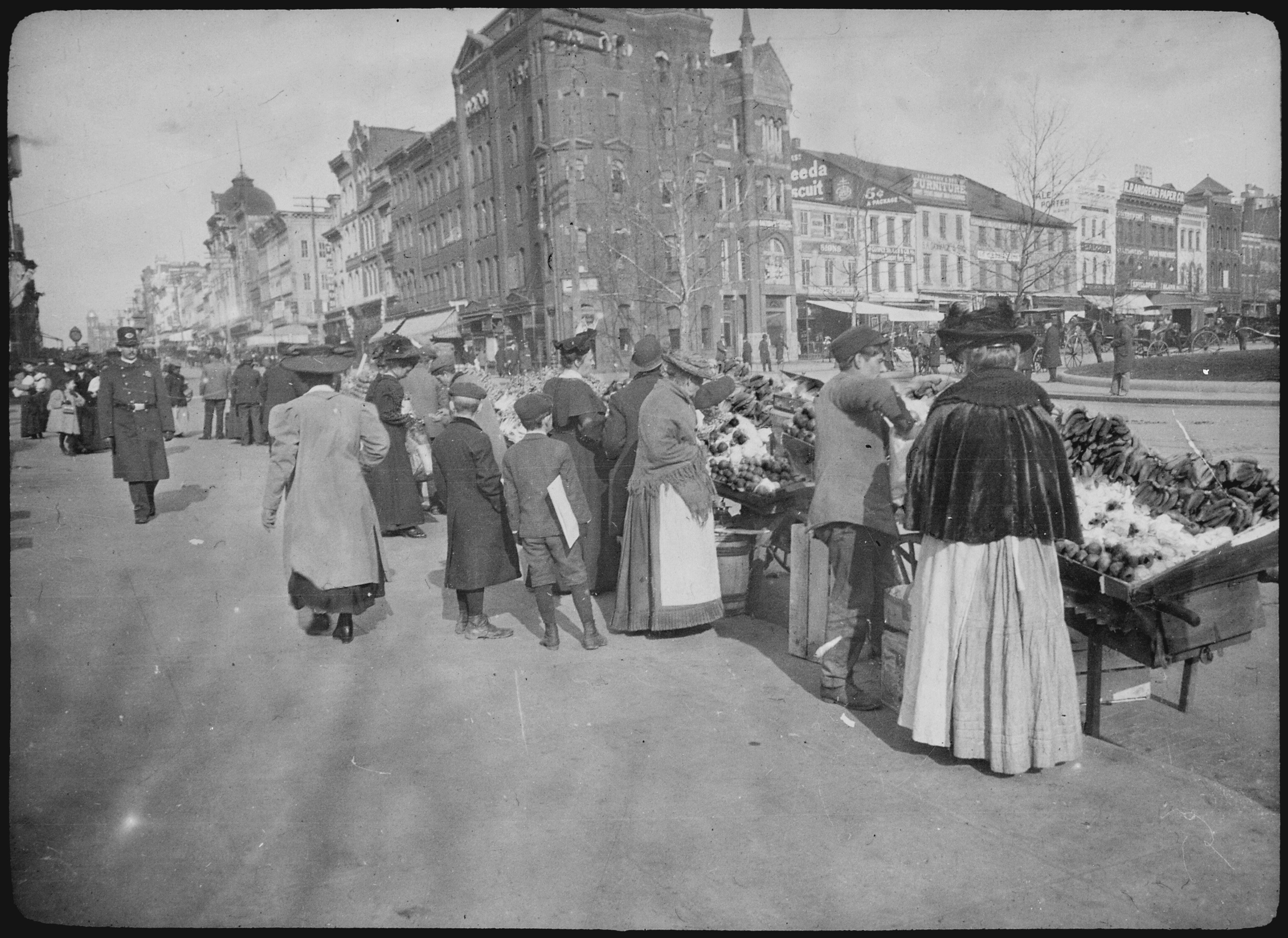
Outdoor food market, 7th at Pennsylvania, c.1900

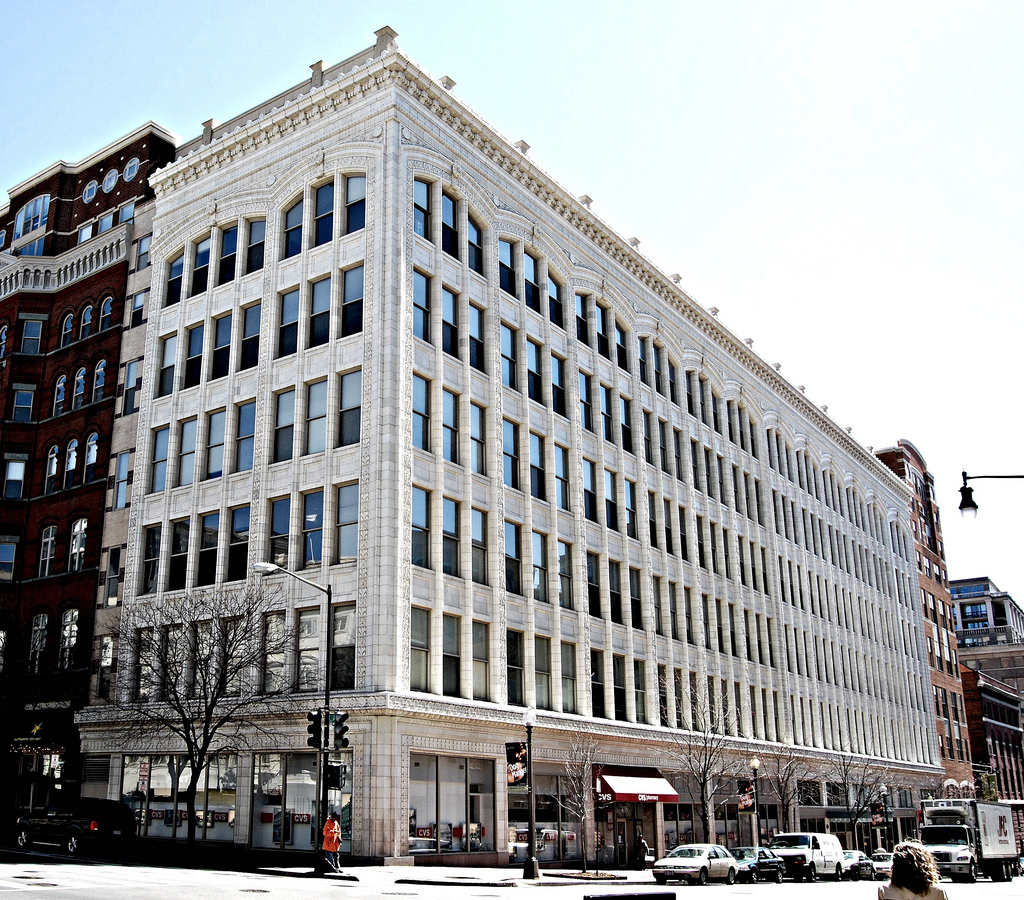
Part of Lansburgh's (built 1916–24), 8th and E

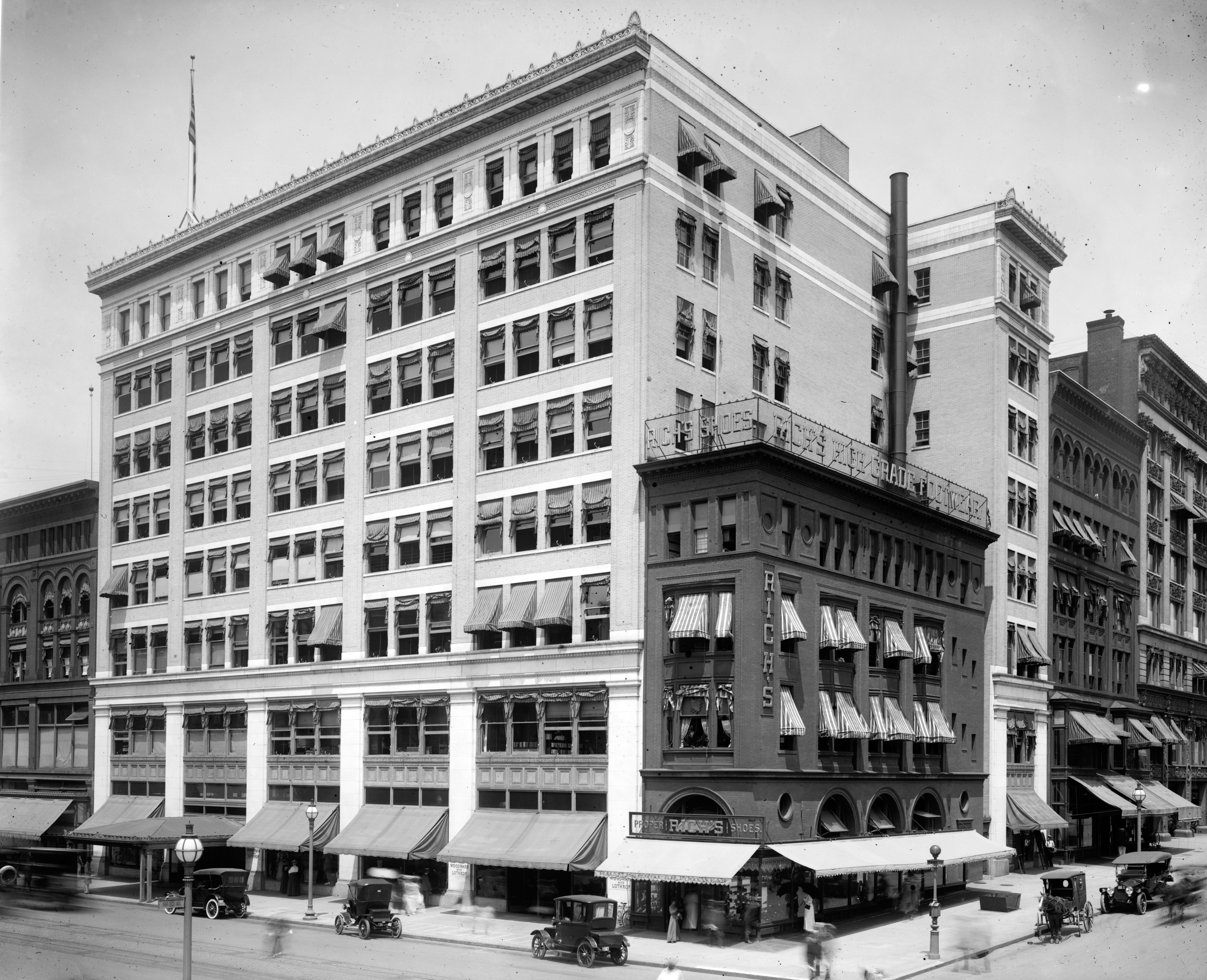
Woodward & Lothrop (W&L) flagship, c.1910s

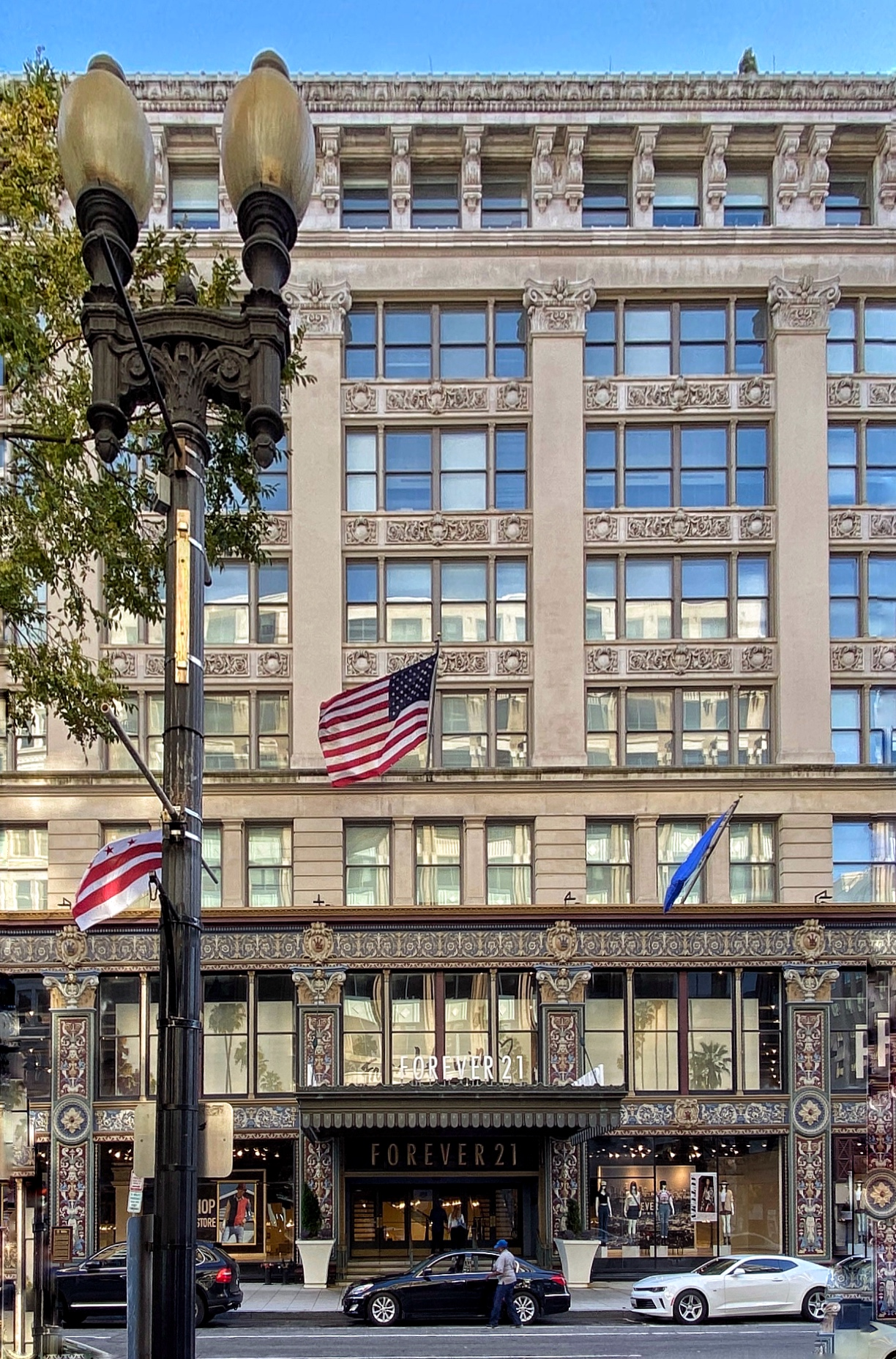
W&L Flagship Bldg., 2019

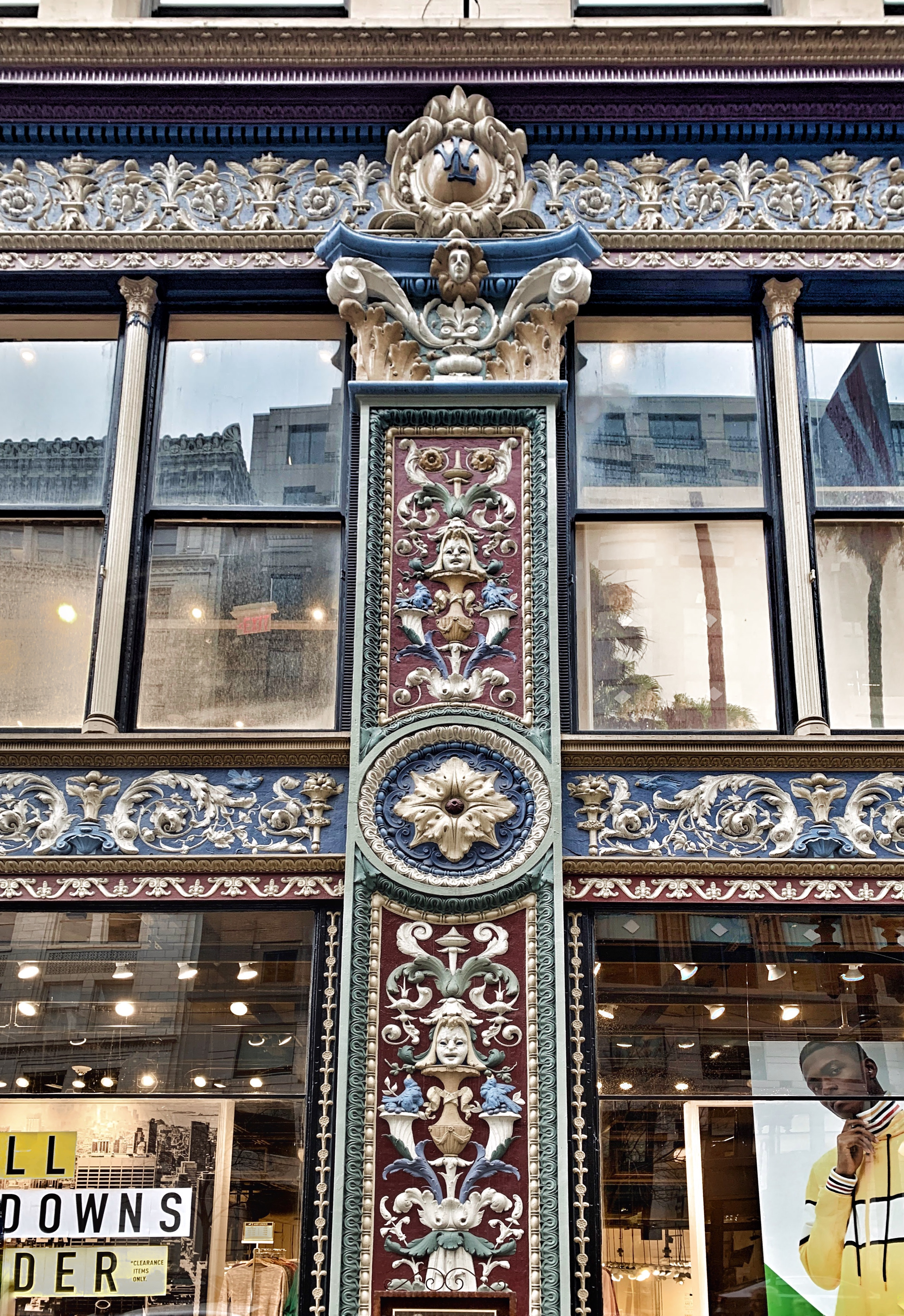
W&L Flagship bas-reliefs

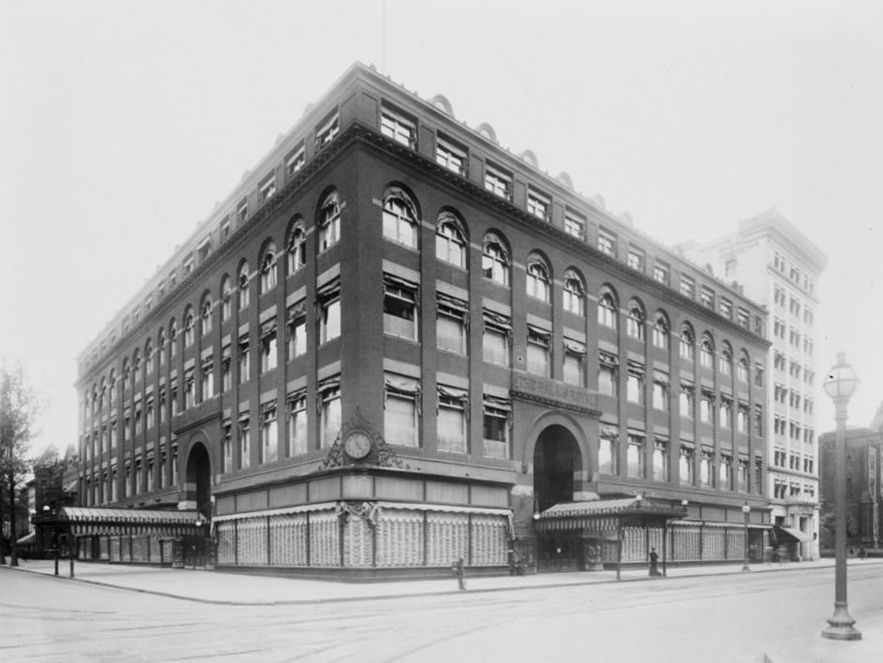
Palais Royal (1893), 11th and G

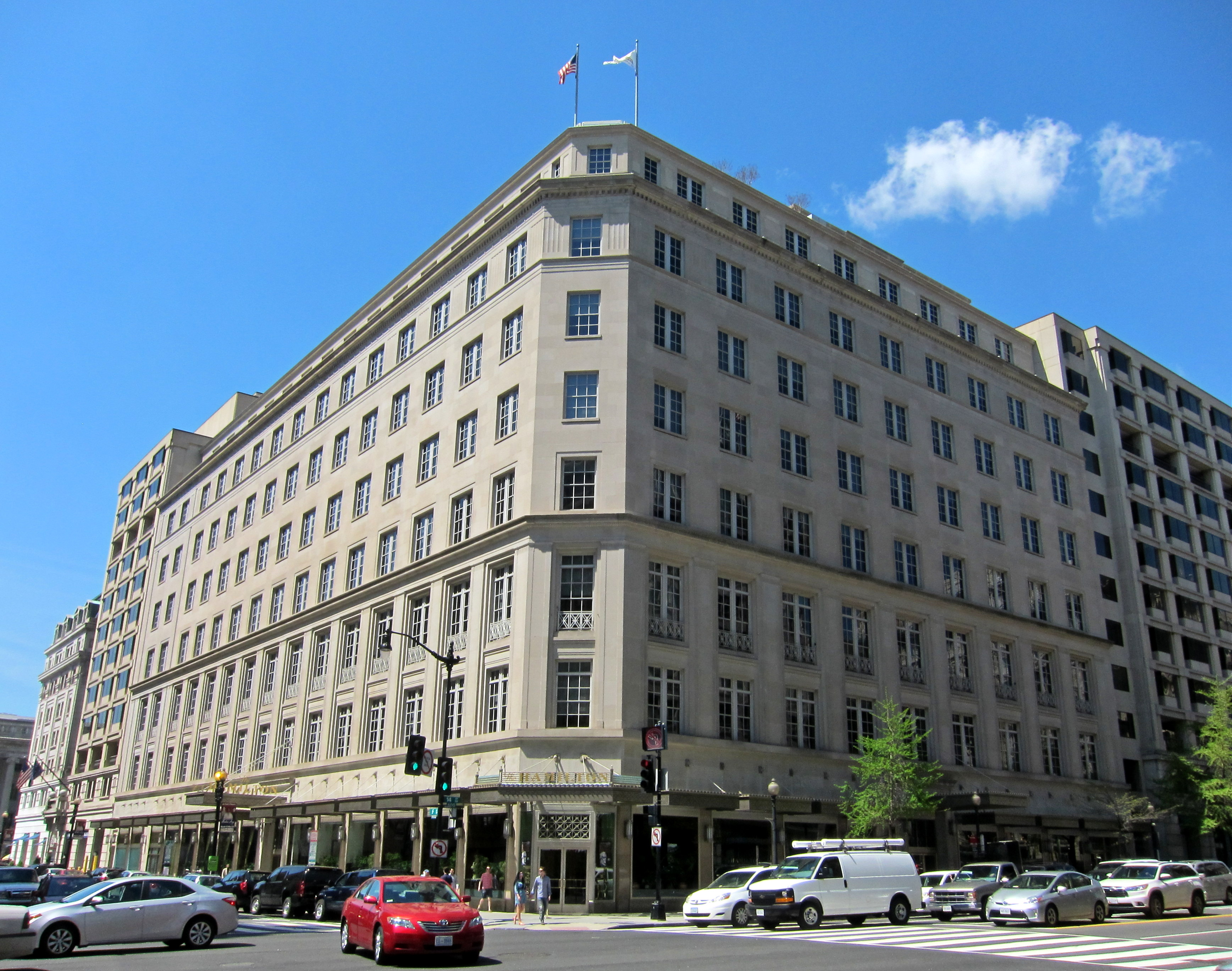
Former Garfinckel's, 14th and F

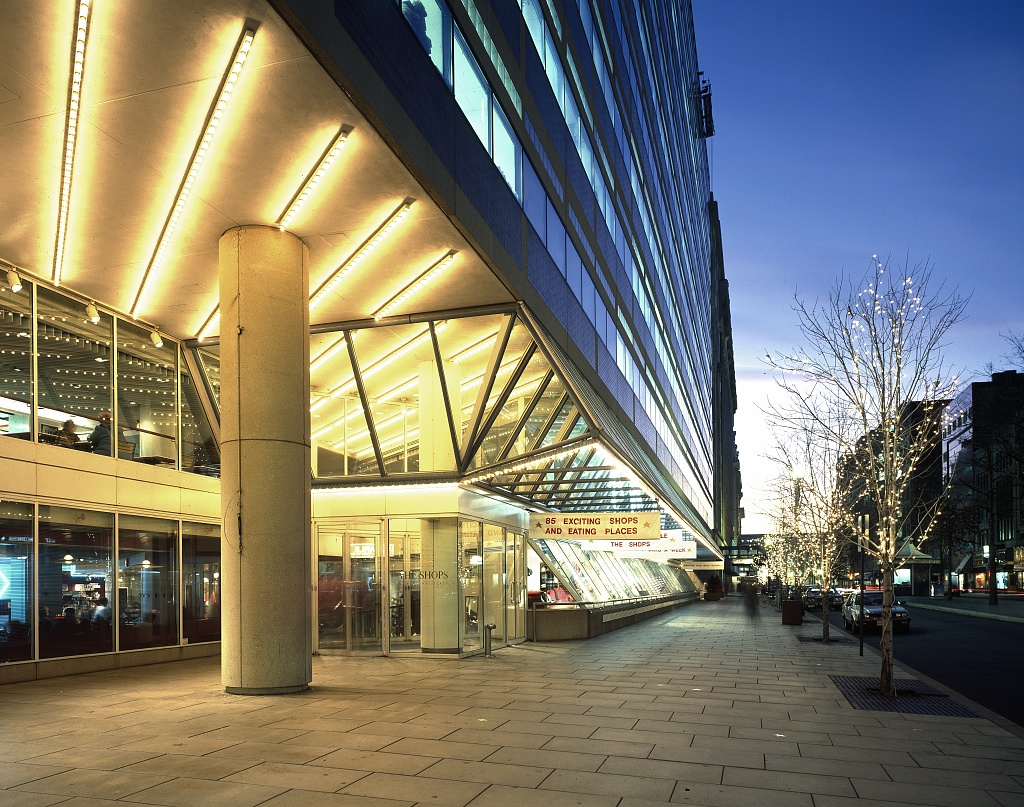
The Shops, c. 1993

From north to south and east to west:

- on F from 6th to 7th, south side, the former flagship of Hecht's department store
- 1316–1324 7th St NW (W side north of N), Harry Kaufman's Stores department store
- 7th and K (SW corner, 706 K St NW): site of Hahn's shoe emporium, flagship of a regional chain
- 7th Street both sides of K: Goldberg's department store (912–928 7th St., 706 K St.)
- 7th Street at United States Navy Memorial Plaza, site of the first Saks and Co. stores (1867, larger store built on same site, 1887)
- on E west of 8th, south side, former Lansburgh's department store (1882–1973)
- SW corner I and 7th, 814 7th St. NW, site of King's Palace department store that operated 1860s through the 1930s. 1914 renovation by Frederick B. Pyle
- on the block bounded by F, G, 10th and 11th streets, former flagship of the Woodward & Lothrop department store chain (1887–1996) reopened in 2003 and currently houses H&M, Forever 21 and Zara.
- 11th and G, site of the second (1893) location of the Palais Royal department store
- Pennsylvania and 12th, northeast corner, site of the original (1870s-1880s) Palais Royal department store, the Centennial Building, at times also home to Bureau of Pensions and the Raleigh Hotel.
- on F, NW corner of 14th, former flagship of Garfinckel's (1930–1990)

== 7th Street furniture retailers ==
In the late 19th and early 20th centuries, 7th Street north of F, as far as O Street in today's Shaw district, was home not only to several of the more economical large department stores such as Goldberg's and Harry Kaufman's, but to the city's concentration of furniture retailers. These included (from north to south):

- 1015 7th Street – Alperstein's Furniture, 1904–present
- 932 7th Street – John Rudden's New Furniture, 1880s
- National Furniture
- 921 7th Street – House & Herrmann, 1886
- Marlo Furniture, 1963
- 915 7th Street – Jackson Brothers, 1903
- 819 7th Street – Samuel W. Augenstein, pre-1891
- Peter Grogan's Furniture Company, 1891–1933
- Peerless Furniture Company, 1935–1968
- Home Furniture and Appliance Company, May 1969 – 1972
- 801 7th Street – John Rudden's New Furniture, 1899
- 718 7th Street – Anton Eberly & Sons, 1868
- Mayer Dodek, Dodek's Furniture & Clothing, 1898
- 515 Seventh Street – Hecht's Department Store
- 7th and D, southeast corner – The Hub Furniture Store, 1855

== Map ==
*site

15th to 14th	14th to 13th	13th to 12th	12th to 11th	11th to 10th	10th to 9th	9th to 8th	8th to 7th	7th to 6th
							Goldberg's*	
K Street
							Hahn's*; Goldberg's*	
I Street
					CityCenterDC		King's Palace*	
H Street
								Gallery Place
		Macy's (Hecht's*)		Palais Royal* (1893-1946); W&L north (1946-1980s)				Gallery Place
G Street
				Woodward & Lothrop*; now Forever 21, H&M, Zara				
Garfinckel's*		T. J. Maxx		Woodward & Lothrop*; now Forever 21, H&M, Zara				
F Street
	Marshall's							Hecht's*
			District Center (Nordstrom Rack, Saks Off Fifth)					Hecht's* (1941 expansion)
E Street NW
							Lansburgh's*	
D Street NW
	National Place		Palais Royal* (1877-1893)				Kann's*	The Hub (furniture)
	National Place		Palais Royal* (1877-1893)				Kann's* — A. Saks & Co.*	
Pennsylvania Avenue NW						Navy Memorial Plaza formerly Market Space)		
						Center Market		
