= Palais Royal (Washington, D.C.) =

Former department store in Washington, D.C.

- Interactive map of the Palais Royal area

General information
- Status: Demolished
- Type: Department store
- Architectural style: Chicago style
- Location: F Street shopping district, 11th and G streets NW, Washington, D.C., United States
- Coordinates: 38.8988°N 77.0270°W
- Year built: 1890–1893
- Opened: 1893
- Demolished: 1987
- Client: Abram Lisner
- Owner: Abram Lisner (1877–1924); S. S. Kresge Company (1924–1946); Woodward & Lothrop (1946–1987)

Technical details
- Floor count: 5

Design and construction
- Architect: Harvey L. Page
- Known for: P

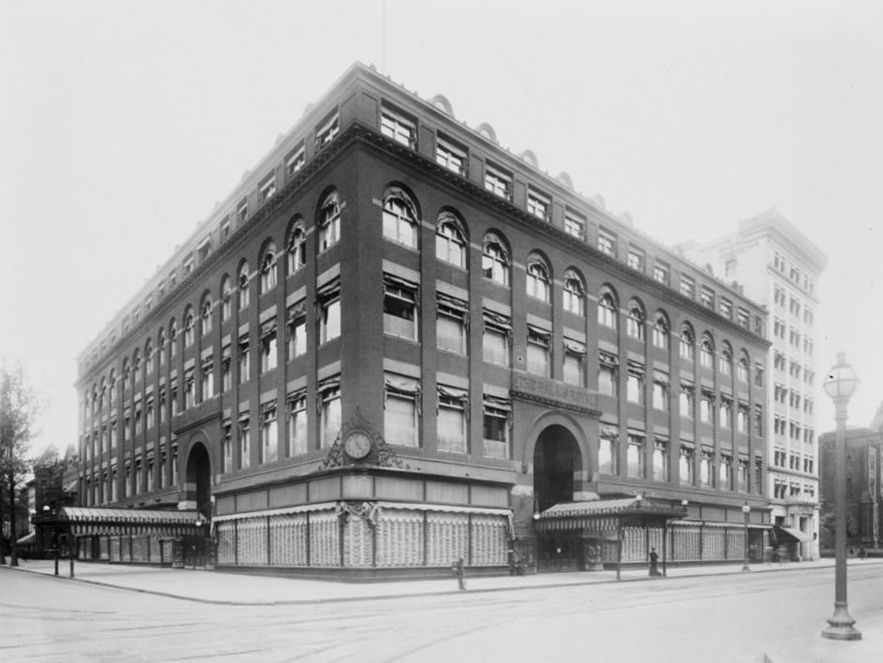
Palais Royal at 11th and G streets NW

Palais Royal was a large department store in Washington, D.C. at 11th and G streets NW in the F Street shopping district. It also grew into a small chain before being purchased and merged into the Woodward & Lothrop chain.

The Palais Royal began in 1877 further south 1117 Pennsylvania Avenue at the northeast corner of 12th St., in the Centennial Building, originally home to the Bureau of Pensions, and which would later become the Raleigh Hotel. It was founded by Abram Lisner (1855-1938), an immigrant from Germany who had first worked with his brother in a dry goods store in New York City. The store continued to expand within and by the 1890s Lisner decided to build a new larger 5-story dedicated structure for the store, further north in the commercial district around the F street corridor, at 11th and G streets. The new store opened in 1893 and was designed by architect Harvey L. Page in the Chicago style, a rarity in Washington, D.C. It continued to expand in its new location, by 1914 employing 600 people. In 1924 Lisner sold it to S. S. Kresge for around $5 million, who sold it to Woodward & Lothrop in 1946. The downtown Palais Royal was across the street from the north side of the Woodward & Lothrop flagship and became an annex of it. Despite protest the building was torn down in 1987 and is now the site of the Washington Center office building. The Palais Royal opened branches in Bethesda (7201 Wisconsin Avenue) in 1942, and two in Arlington in 1943: Arlington Farms and at the Pentagon, which became Woodies branches.
