= Whittemore House (Washington, D.C.) =

Historic house in Washington, D.C., United States

- U.S. National Register of Historic Places
- U.S. Historic district – Contributing property
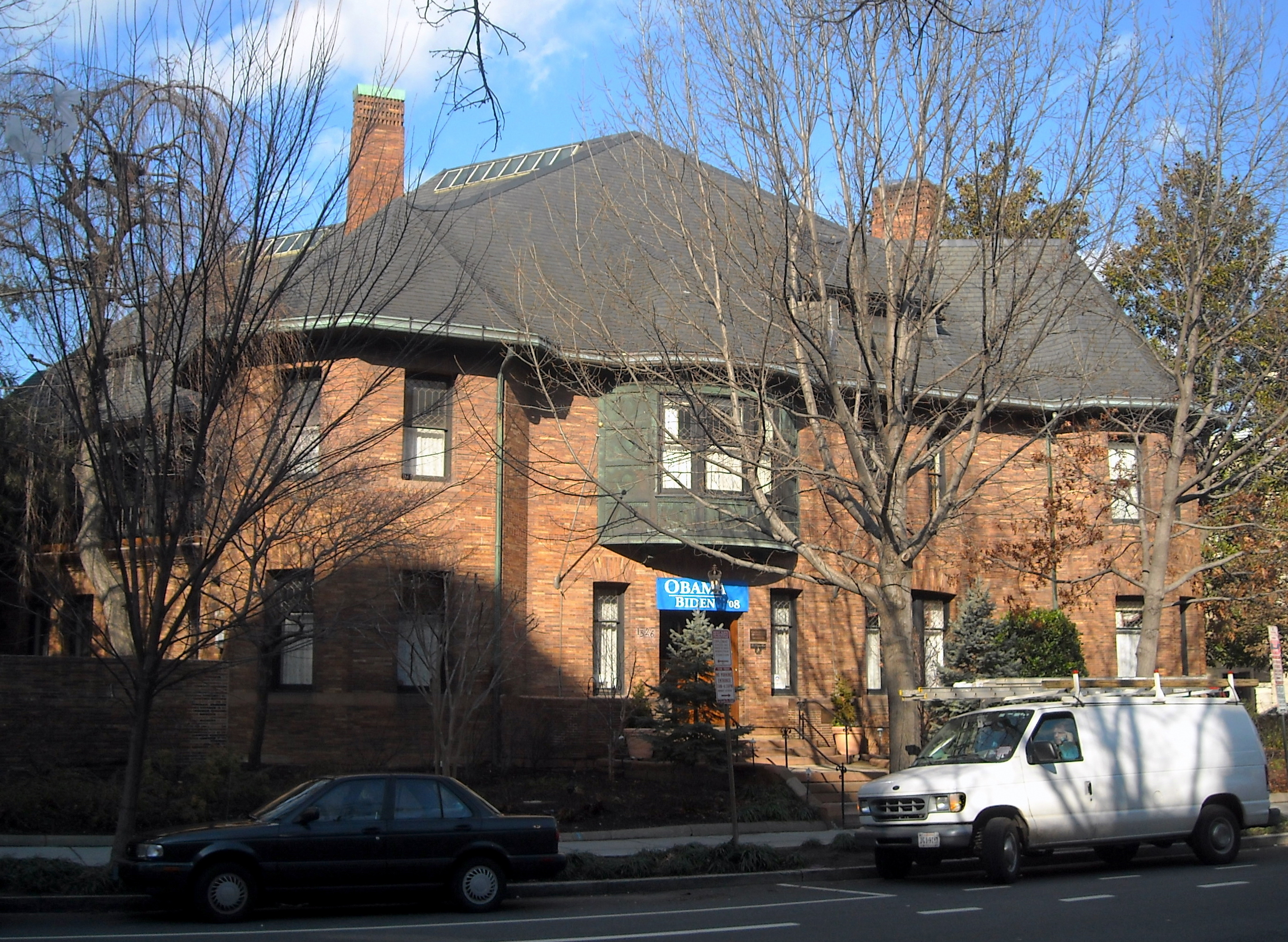
- Whittemore House in 2009

- Location within Washington, D.C.
- Location: 1526 New Hampshire Avenue, N.W. Washington, D.C.
- Coordinates: 38°54′38.49″N 77°2′32.88″W
- Built: 1894
- Architect: Harvey L. Page
- Architectural style: Shingle style
- Part of: Dupont Circle Historic District (ID78003056)
- NRHP reference No.: 73002126
- Added to NRHP: July 16, 1973

Whittemore House (also known as the Walter D. Wilcox House and the John C. Weeks House) is an historic building located at 1526 New Hampshire Avenue, N.W., in the Dupont Circle neighborhood of Washington, D.C. The former private residence, whose previous occupants include a musician, several politicians, and a mountain explorer, now serves as a historic house museum and headquarters of the Woman's National Democratic Club (WNDC).

== History ==
The Shingle style home was designed by local architect Harvey L. Page in 1892 and completed two years later. The original owner was opera singer Sarah Adams Whittemore, the daughter of Reverend Henry Adams, a descendant of President John Adams.

In addition to Whittemore, past occupants include Senator John F. Dryden (1903), railroad entrepreneur and chairman of the Isthmian Canal Commission Theodore P. Shonts (1906-1907), and Representative John W. Weeks (1907-1911). In 1907, Canadian Rockies explorer Walter Wilcox inherited the house, and lived there from 1911 to 1926. The following year the home was purchased by the WNDC. In 1967, the addition of a ballroom on the Q Street side of the building was completed. The concrete Modernist expansion was designed by architect Nicholas Satterlee, whose work includes Holmes Run Acres.

The Whittemore House was added to the National Register of Historic Places in 1973, and is designated as a contributing property to the Dupont Circle Historic District.

== Current usage ==
In addition to serving as the WNDC's clubhouse, Whittemore House is home to the Woman's National Democratic Club Museum, which features memorabilia from various Democratic political campaigns, photographs, antique furnishings from the Gilded Age, and art exhibits.

== See also ==
- List of museums in Washington, D.C.
- List of women's club buildings
- National Register of Historic Places listings in the upper NW Quadrant of Washington, D. C.
