= Kann's =

S. Kann Sons Co.
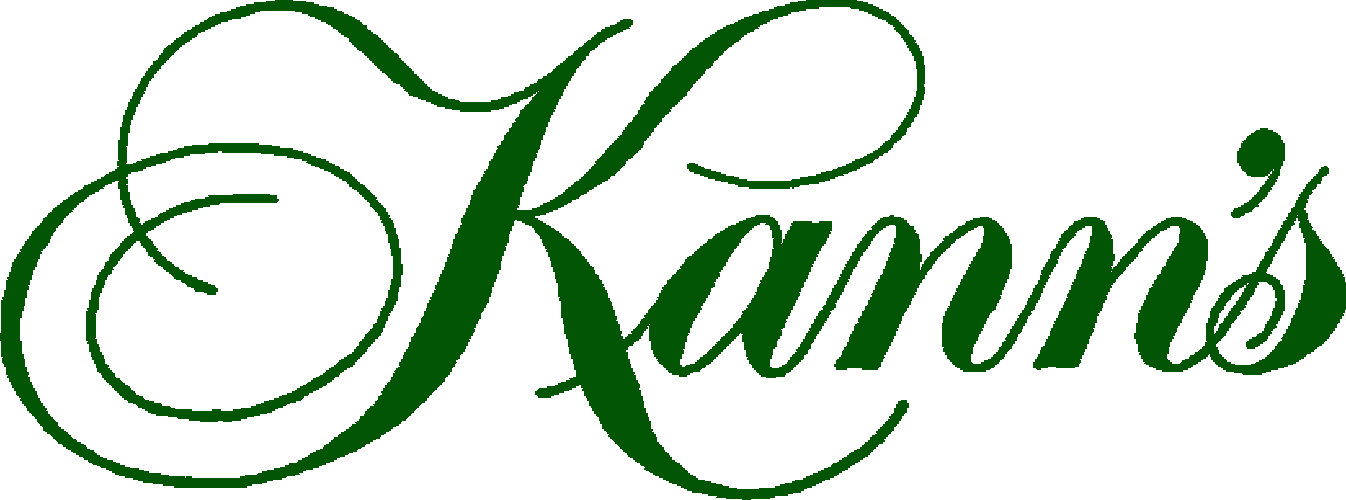
- Industry: Retail
- Founded: 1893
- Defunct: 1975
- Fate: Liquidation
- Headquarters: Washington, D.C., U.S.
- Products: General Merchandise
- Parent: L. S. Good and Co.

S. Kann Sons Co., or more commonly Kann's was a department store based in Washington, D.C. It was the city's second department store and pioneered the one-price policy and "the customer is always right" concept in retailing on the Washington, D.C. retail scene. The stores allowed consumers to return goods for cash.

== History ==
The company was founded in Washington, D.C. in 1893, by Louis, Solomon, and Sigmund Kann. The Baltimore family originally came to Washington in 1890, to liquidate Abe Kaufman's store at 909 Pennsylvania Ave., NW, and returned to establish a permanent business. The store remained family owned until 1971, when it was sold to L. S. Good and Co. in Wheeling, West Virginia. The company closed in 1975.

== Flagship store ==
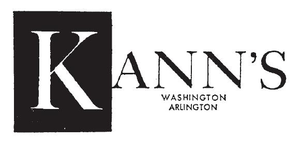
Classic logo

The main store of S. Kann Sons Co. was located at 8th Street and Market Place, N.W., at Pennsylvania Avenue, in Washington, D.C.'s downtown shopping district. After founding at this location in 1893, the company expanded into neighboring storefronts until 1913, when it embarked on a major expansion to four stories and creation of a public dining room. In 1959, the company received approval from the Fine Arts Commission, to integrate its disparate 19th Century storefronts with anodized aluminum sheeting, as part of a $500,000 renovation and modernization project. After its closing in 1975, the store remained vacant until purchased for $4.275 million in 1978, by the Pennsylvania Avenue Development Corporation (PADC). The PADC purchased the site for redevelopment as housing. On March 31, 1979, a fire at the flagship store resulted in its immediate demolition. At a hearing before the U.S. Senate, D.C. fire marshal Carmel Del Bazo reported to Senator Patrick Leahy that "the possibility of an accidental cause of the fire is excluded." After demolition, the site immediately across from the National Archives Building remained vacant until redeveloped as Market Square in the early 1990s.

== Virginia Square store ==
Kann's was the second Washington D.C.–based department store chain to open a suburban location in nearby Northern Virginia. Just two weeks after the Hecht Company opened its store at Parkington Shopping Center, on November 16, 1951, Kann's opened its store at N. Fairfax Drive and N. Kirkwood Rd., in Arlington County, Virginia. The $4.5 million, three story store, known as Kann's Virginia, opened in conjunction with the neighboring Virginia Square Shopping Center. At opening, the store featured imported squirrel monkeys from Brazil named Teeny, Weeny, Eeny, and Miney to entertain children in the shoe department; a package assembly system using conveyor belts; "Kannteen" restaurant; customer lounge; and hospital room with nurse in attendance. After closing in 1975, the store was acquired in 1979, by George Mason University, which used the building for its Arlington campus. The building was used first for the law school and later for the School of Public Policy. The building was demolished in 2021.
