= List of theaters in Washington, D.C. =

This list of theaters and entertainment venues in Washington, D.C. includes present-day opera houses and theaters, cabarets, music halls and other places of live entertainment in Washington, D.C.

== Current theaters ==
Theater	Stage	Location	Built	Capacity	Website
Andrew W. Mellon Auditorium		Federal Triangle	1935	1000	
Arena Stage	Fichandler Stage	Southwest	1950	683	
Arena Stage	Kreeger Theater	Southwest	1950	514	
Arena Stage	Arlene and Robert Kogod Cradle	Southwest	1950	200	
Atlas Performing Arts Center	Lang Theater	H Street	2005 (established 1938)	258	
Atlas Performing Arts Center	Sprenger Theater	H Street	2005 (established 1938)	160	
Atlas Performing Arts Center	Atlas Lab Theatre I	H Street	2005 (established 1938)	70	
Atlas Performing Arts Center	Atlas Lab Theatre II	H Street	2005 (established 1938)	82	
Carter Barron Amphitheater		Rock Creek Park	1949	4200	
Anacostia Playhouse		Anacostia	2013	120	
Dance Place		Brookland	1978	0	
DAR Constitution Hall		Downtown	1929	3702	
D.C. Arts Center (DCAC)		Adams Morgan	1989	42	
Duke Ellington School of the Arts Theatre		Georgetown	2017	800	
DCJCC	Theater J	Dupont Circle	1990	238	
Folger Shakespeare Theater		Capitol Hill	1932	250	
Ford's Theater		Penn Quarter	1863	665	
GALA Hispanic Theatre		Columbia Heights	1976	265	
Hamilton Live		Downtown	???	354	
Howard Theater		Shaw	1910	1100	
John F. Kennedy Center for the Performing Arts	Concert Hall	Foggy Bottom	1971	2465	
John F. Kennedy Center for the Performing Arts	Opera House	Foggy Bottom	1971	2364	
John F. Kennedy Center for the Performing Arts	Eisenhower Theater	Foggy Bottom	1971	1164	
John F. Kennedy Center for the Performing Arts	Family Theater	Foggy Bottom	1971	324	
John F. Kennedy Center for the Performing Arts	Theater Lab	Foggy Bottom	1971	388	
John F. Kennedy Center for the Performing Arts	Terrace Theater	Foggy Bottom	1971	490	
John F. Kennedy Center for the Performing Arts	Millennium Stage	Foggy Bottom	1971	235	
Keegan Theatre		Dupont Circle	1996	120	
Lincoln Theatre		U Street	1922	1225	
Lisner Auditorium		Foggy Bottom	1946	1490	
National Theatre		Downtown	1835	1676	
Shakespeare Theatre Company	Lansburgh Theatre	Penn Quarter	2007 (founded 1970)	451	
Shakespeare Theatre Company	Sidney Harman Hall	Penn Quarter	2007 (founded 1970)	774	
Sixth & I Historic Synagogue		Chinatown	2004 (built 1908)	800	
Sylvan Theater		National Mall	1917		
Source Theatre		U Street	2008	150	
Sitar Arts Center		Adams Morgan	2001	0	
Studio 1469		Columbia Heights			
Studio Theatre	Mead Theater	4th Street	1978	218	
Studio Theatre	Metheny Theater	4th Street	1978	200	
Studio Theatre	Milton Theater	4th Street	1978	187	
Studio Theatre	Stage 4	4th Street	1978	120	
Warner Theatre		Penn Quarter	1992 (built 1924)	1847	
Washington Stage Guild	Undercroft Theatre	Mt. Vernon Square (founded 1986)	148		
Woolly Mammoth Theatre		Penn Quarter	2005 (founded 1980)	265	

== Producing theaters ==
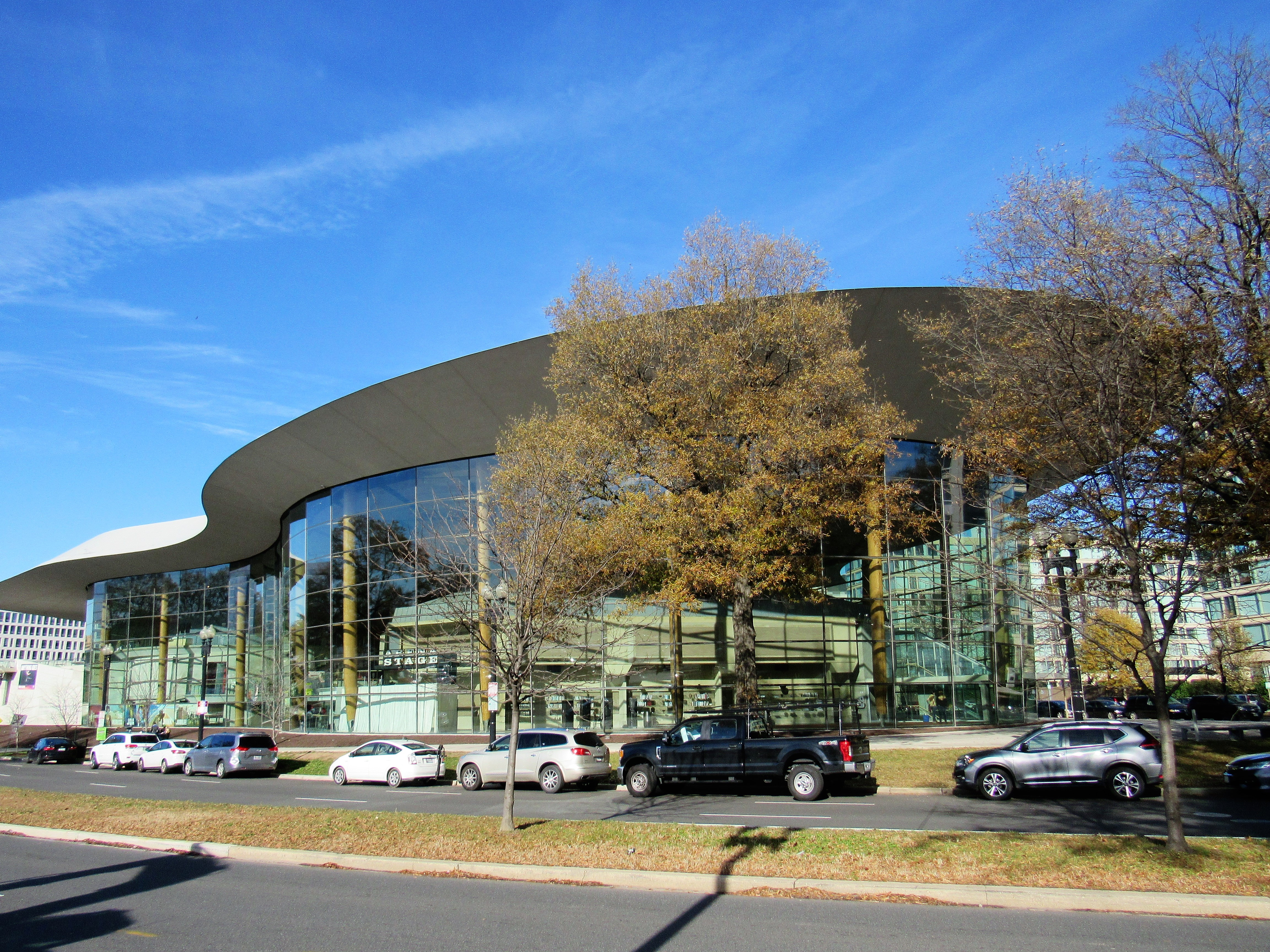
Arena Stage

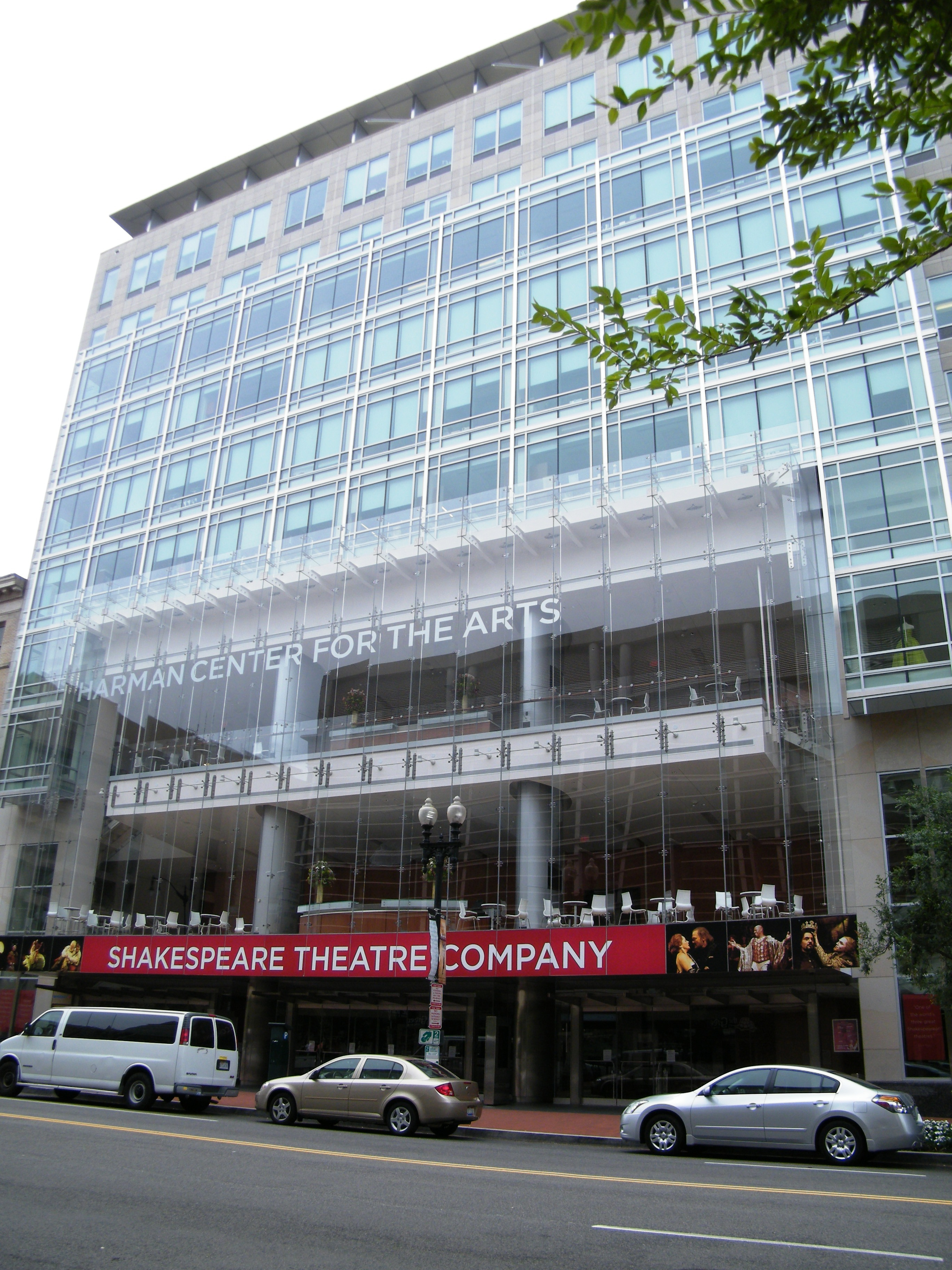
The Harman Center for the Arts, a major theater of the Shakespeare Theatre Company

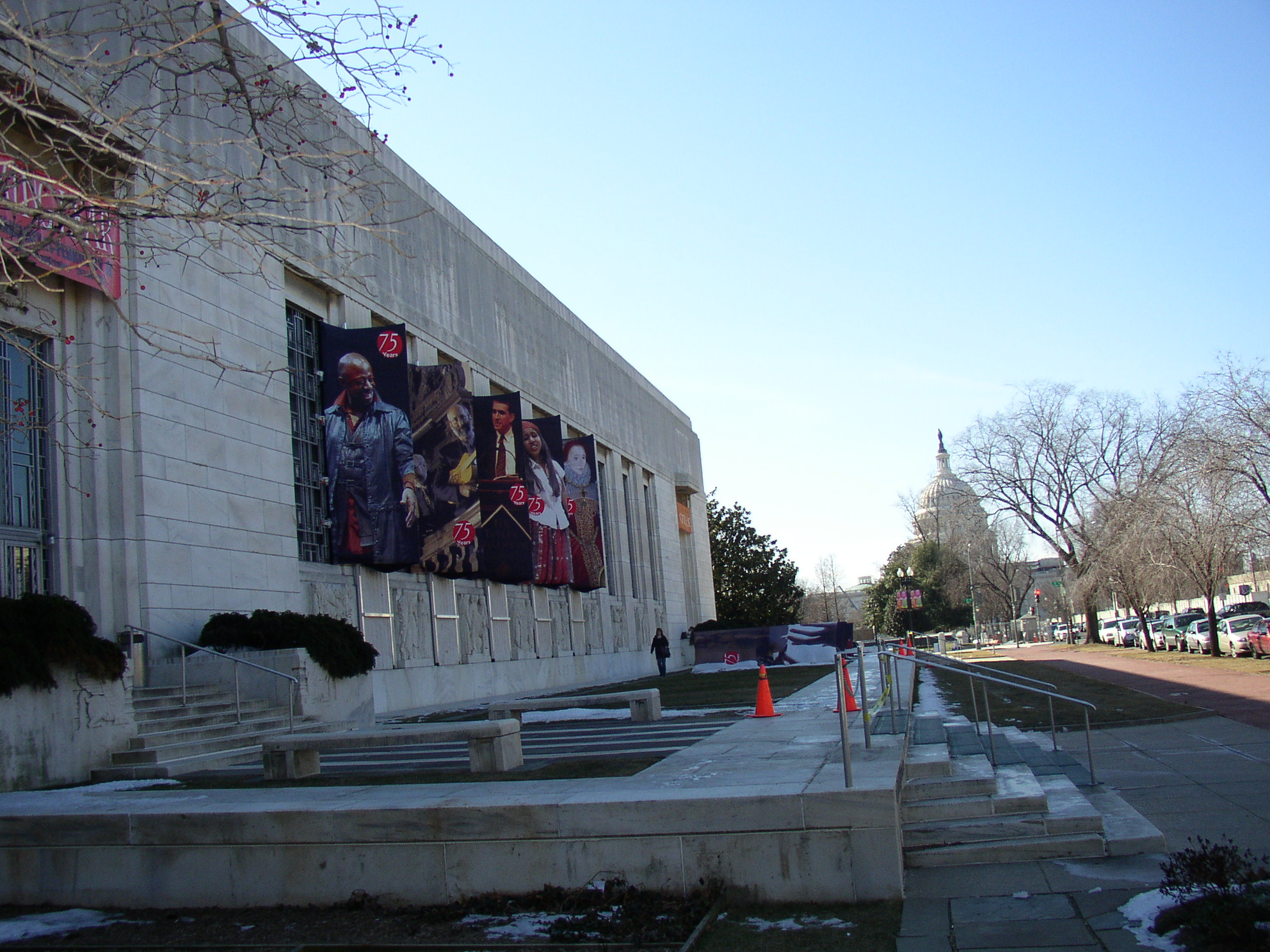
The Folger Shakespeare Library

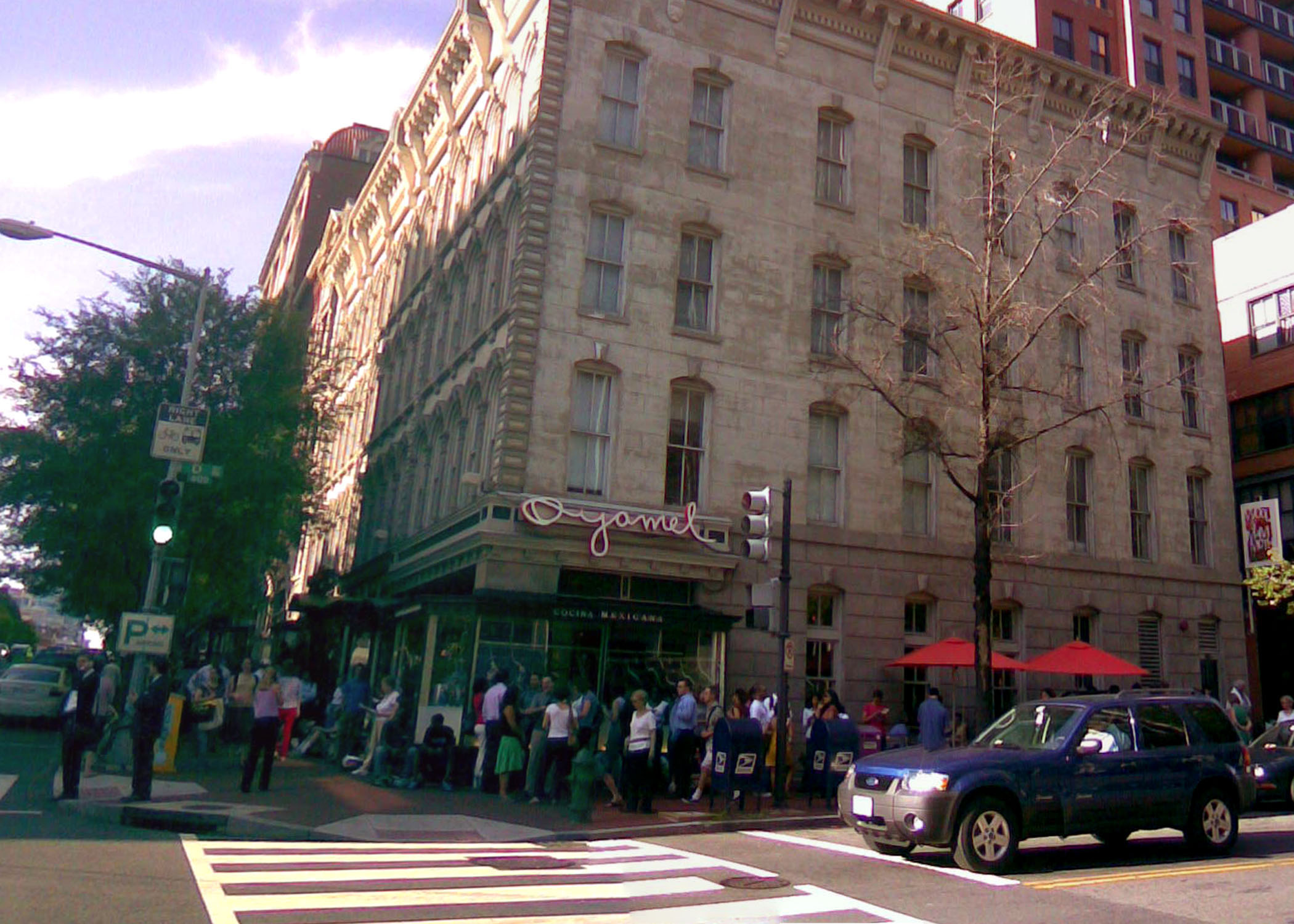
The Woolly Mammoth Theatre Company

- Adventure Theatre
- Arena Stage at the Mead Center for American Theater - Recipient of the 1976 Regional Theatre Tony Award
  - Fichandler Stage
  - Kreeger Theater
  - The Kogod Cradle
- Capital Fringe Festival, with annual, temporary venues
- Capitol Steps (closed in 2020)
- Constellation Theatre Company
- DC Improv
- Discovery Theater at the Smithsonian Ripley Center
- Folger Theatre at the Elizabethan Theatre
- GALA Hispanic Theatre at the Tivoli Theatre
- Glaser-Luchs Studio Theater at the National Conservatory of the Dramatic Arts
- Hexagon at the Duke Ellington School
- Histrio (Theater), A French Theater
- Olney Theatre Center for the Arts
- Keegan Theatre
- Mosaic Theater Company of DC
- Rorschach Theatre
- Round House Theatre
- Shakespeare Theatre Company at the Harman Center for the Arts - Recipient of the 2012 Regional Theatre Tony Award
  - Sidney Harman Hall
  - Lansburgh Theatre
- Signature Theatre - Recipient of the 2009 Regional Theatre Tony Award
- Silver Spring Stage
- St Mark's Players
- Studio Theatre
  - Mead Theatre
  - Milton Theatre
  - Metheny Theatre
  - Stage 4
- Synetic Theater
- Teatro de la Luna at Casa de la Luna
- Theater J at The Cecile Goldman Theater, Morris Cafritz Center for the Arts
- Theater of the First Amendment at George Mason University
- Washington Audio Theater
- Washington Stage Guild
- Woolly Mammoth Theatre Company

== Presenting and rental theaters ==
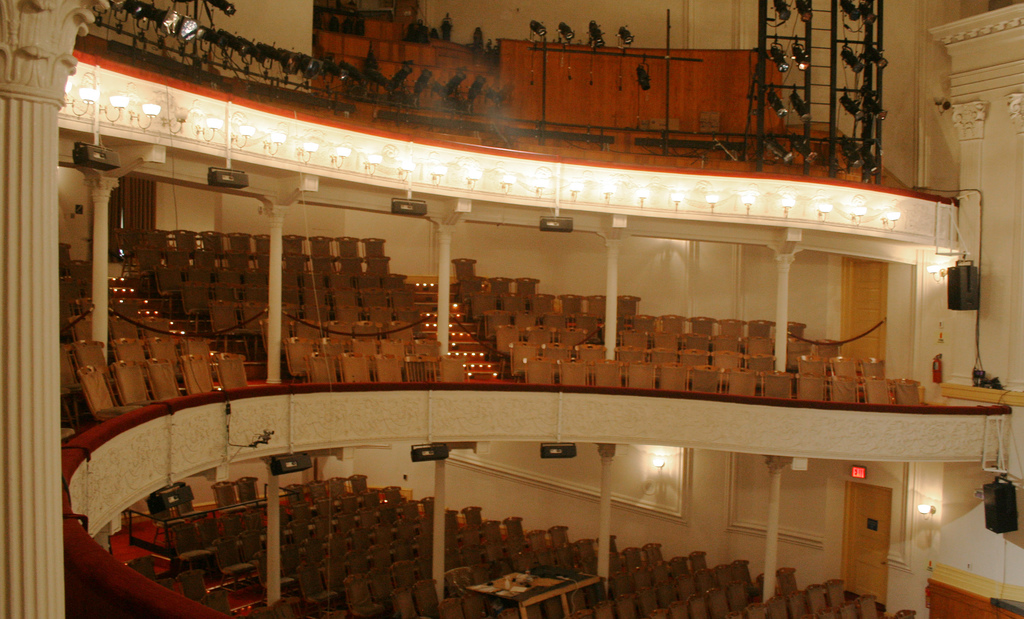
The interior of Ford's Theatre

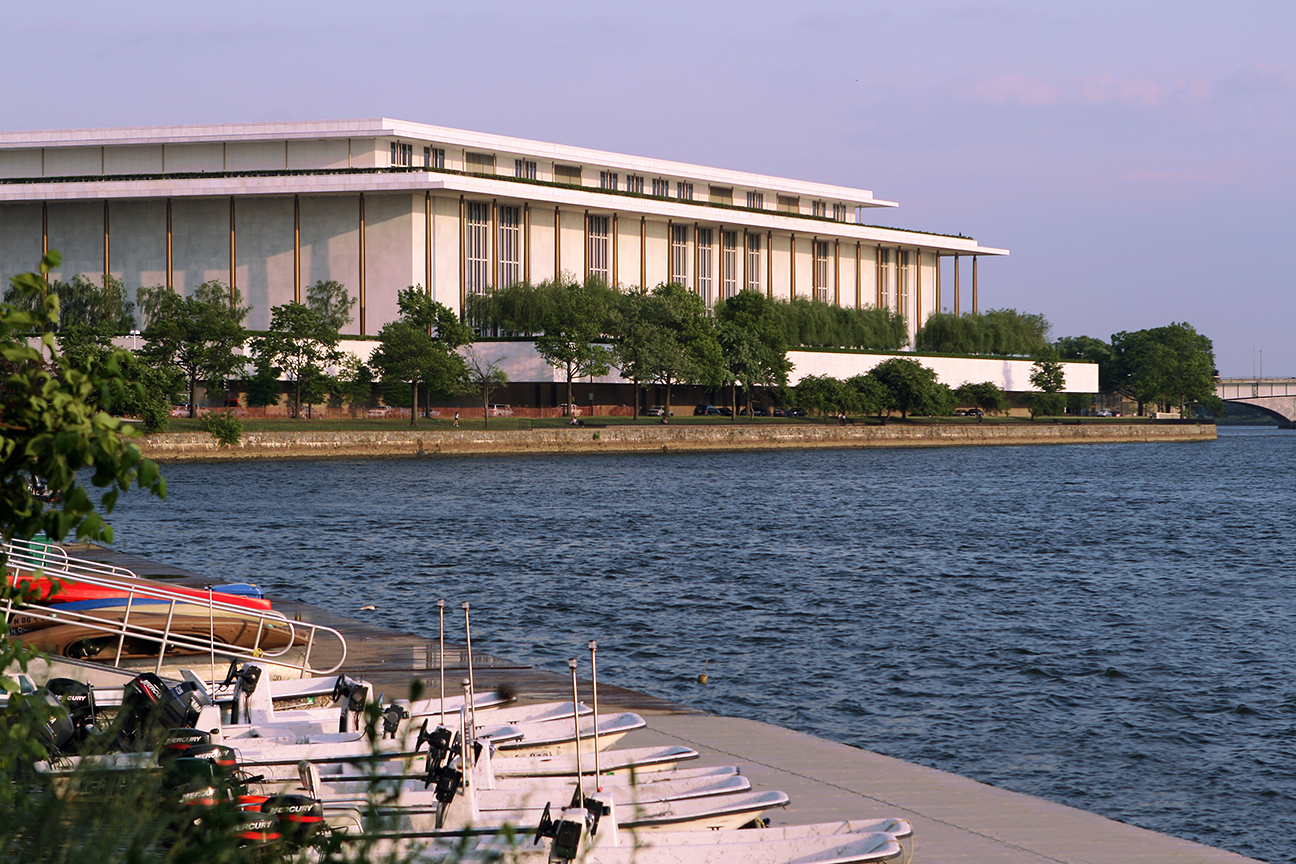
The Kennedy Center for the Performing Arts

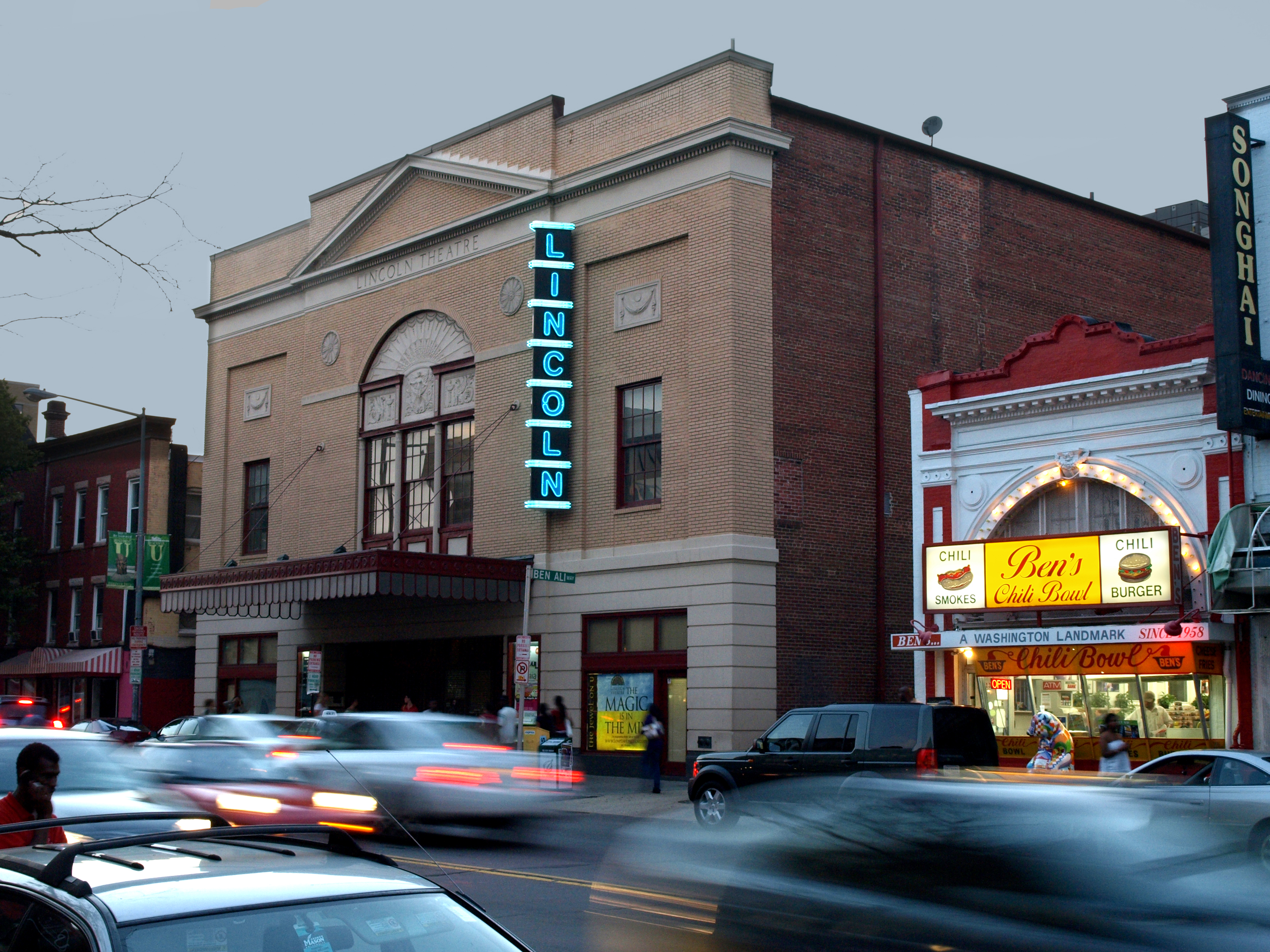
The Lincoln Theatre is located on the U Street Corridor.

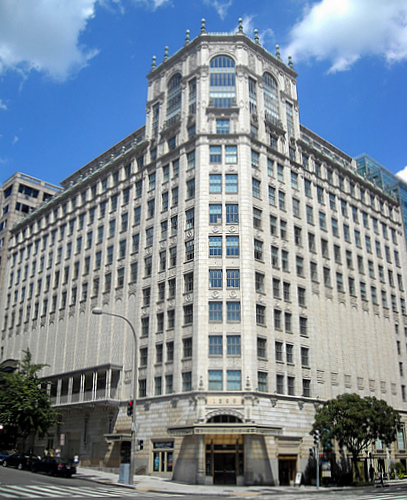
The Warner Theatre

- Anacostia Playhouse
- Atlas Performing Arts Center
  - Lang Theater
  - Sprenger Theater
  - Atlas Theater Lab 1
  - Atlas Theater Lab 2
- Carter Barron Amphitheater
- Church Street Theater
- Corner Store, The
- Dance Place
- DAR Constitution Hall
- D.C. Arts Center (DCAC)
- Ford's Theatre
- H Street Playhouse
- Howard Theater
- Lisner Auditorium
- Jack Guidone Theater at Joy of Motion Dance Center
- John F. Kennedy Center for the Performing Arts
  - Kennedy Center Concert Hall
  - Kennedy Center Opera House
  - Eisenhower Theater
  - Family Theater
  - Theater Lab
  - Terrace Theater
  - Millennium Stage
  - KC Jazz Club
- Lincoln Theatre
- Mead Theatre Lab at Flashpoint
- Metro Cafe
- National Theatre
- National Sylvan Theater
- Source Theatre
- The Puppet Co.
- DeLaski Theater at the Sitar Arts Center
- Town Hall Education, Arts & Recreation Campus (THEARC) Theater
- Warehouse Theatre
  - Mainstage
  - Second Stage
- Warner Theatre

== Independent companies ==
- African Continuum Theatre Company
- Ambassador Theater, International Cultural Center
- Artists' Initiative
- Avant Bard Theatre, formerly Washington Shakespeare Company/WSC Avant Bard
- banished? productions
- Bouncing Ball Theatrical Productions
- Brave Spirits Theatre -- Closing
- Constellation Theatre Company
- Didactic Theatre Company
- Doorway Arts Ensemble
- dog & pony dc
- Faction of Fools Theatre Company
- Federal Theatre Project
- Flying V Theatre
- Forum Theatre
- Ganymede Arts (formerly the Actors' Theatre of Washington)
- Gross National Product Comedy - founder John Simmons
- Happenstance Theater
- Horizons Theatre
- Journeymen Theater Ensemble
- Keegan Theatre
- Lean & Hungry Theatre
- Longacre Lea Productions
- Madcap Players
- MuseFire Productions
- Now This!
- Omaemoda Productions
- Open Circle Theatre
- Pointless Theatre Company
- SCENA Theatre
- Serenity Players
- Solas Nua
- Spooky Action Theater
- Taffety Punk Theatre Company
- The In Series
- The Landless Theatre Company
- The Puppet Co.
- The Rude Mechanicals
- The Saartjie Project
- Theater Alliance
- Venus Theatre Company
- Washington Audio Theater
- Washington Improv Theater
- Washington National Opera
- Washington Savoyards
- Yams Theatre, Inc.
- Young Playwrights' Theater
- Washington Audio Theater
- Wildwood Summer Theatre

== Educational theater ==
- Harold and Sylvia Greenberg Theatre, American University
- Katzen Arts Center, American University
  - Abramson Family Recital Hall
  - Studio Theatre
- Hartke Theatre, Catholic University of America
- Elstad Auditorium, Gallaudet University
- Dorothy Betts Marvin Theatre, George Washington University
- Royden B. Davis, S.J. Performing Arts Center, Georgetown University
  - Gonda Theatre
  - Devine Studio Theatre
- Walsh Black Box, Georgetown University
- Poulton Hall, Georgetown University
- Fine Arts Complex, Howard University
  - Ira Aldridge Theater
  - Environmental Theatre Space (ETS)
- Auditorium, University of the District of Columbia
- The Theatre Lab School of Dramatic Arts

== Former theaters ==
- Academy of Music; opened as Lincoln Music Hall in 1889 and re-named Academy of Music in 1892. Destroyed by fire in 1907. Rebuilt same year, and re-opened as Academy of Music. Became a cinema in 1914 known as first Moore's Orpheum Theatre and then the Strand Theatre. Was a burlesque theater in the 1940s. Closed in 1949. Demolished in 1952.
- Takoma Theater

== Theater organizations ==
- theatreWashington
- League of Washington Theaters
- Cultural Alliance of Greater Washington
- Dance/Metro DC

== Theater awards ==
- Helen Hayes Awards
- Kennedy Center Honors
- Mary Goldwater Award
- Offstage Honors ("The Offies")
- Richard Bauer Award
- Ruby Griffith Award
- Usher's Favorite Show Award
- Washington Area Theatre Community Honors (WATCH Awards)
