= The Bread of Winter =

2009 play by Victor Lodato

The Bread of Winter is a 2009 drama in two acts by American playwright and author Victor Lodato. The play received its world premiere by Theater Alliance at the H Street Playhouse in a production that ran from April 16 to May 9, 2009. It was the subject of a 2004 New York Times article entitled "Workshopped to Death," which described Lodato's frustration with not yet having seen his play given a full production. The Bread of Winter received several readings, workshops, and prestigious awards before ever making it to the stage.

== Summary ==
The following is a summary of The Bread of Winter from playwright Victor Lodato's website: "Ten-year-old Gregory, estranged from his mother, and caught in a brutal relationship with his older brother, has developed an intense attachment to the family’s housekeeper. Five individuals, each seeking solace and companionship, begin to collide with each other in an escalating game of desperation and violence, while a stunningly cold winter rages behind them. And what is that strange light in the sky? Salvation or apocalypse?"

== Production history ==
Theater Alliance presented the world premiere in April and May 2009; the production was directed by Dorothy Neumann and featured Amy McWilliams as Libby, William Beech as Gregory, Ben Kingsland as Richard, Richard Pelzman as Jack, and Rosemary Regan as Gert. The production received positive reviews from critics including Celia Wren of the Washington Post, who called The Bread of Winter a "mysterious and chilling drama" and praised the "five vivid performances" of the cast. Theater Alliance's production received a 2010 Helen Hayes Award nomination for Outstanding New Play or Musical (also called the Charles MacArthur Award).
