= Mark Rhea =

American theatre actor, director, and producer (born 20th century)

Mark Rhea (born 20th century) is an American director, actor, and arts leader.

He is the founder and producing artistic director of Keegan Theatre, a small professional American theater based in Washington, D.C. Rhea founded Keegan in 1996, staging Cat on a Hot Tin Roof as its first production in 1997.

== Awards and recognition ==
A four-time Helen Hayes Awards nominee, Rhea was honored for Outstanding Direction, Musical-Helen Production in 2017 for Keegan's production of Next to Normal.

== Theatre credits ==
Rhea has produced, directed or co-directed more than sixty productions at Keegan since 1997, including annual productions of An Irish Carol and multiple touring productions to Ireland. His directing credits include Keegan productions of Chicago, Big Fish, The Lonesome West, Next to Normal, and American Idiot.

He has also acted in more than forty Keegan Theatre productions. His notable acting roles have included Teach in American Buffalo, Lt. Col. Nathan Jessup in A Few Good Men, Howie in Rabbit Hole, Carmichael in A Beheading in Spokane, John Proctor in The Crucible, Biff Loman in Death of a Salesman, and Stanley Kowalski in A Streetcar Named Desire.

== Personal life ==
A Texan of Irish heritage, Rhea is married to fellow artist Susan Marie Rhea, an actor, director, and artistic director of Keegan Theatre. They were married in 2003 in Galway, Ireland, while touring Ireland with Keegan's production of Who's Afraid of Virginia Woolf?.
