= Plymouth Theatre =

Plymouth Theatre or Plymouth Theater may refer to:

- Plymouth Theatre (Boston)
- Plymouth Theatre (Worcester)
- Gerald Schoenfeld Theatre, New York City, formerly the Plymouth Theatre
- H Street Playhouse, Washington, D.C., formerly the Plymouth Theater
