= Forum Theatre (Washington, D.C.) =

Former theatre company in Washington, D.C.

- Company logo
- Formation: 2003
- Type: Theatre group
- Location: Washington, D.C.
- Artistic director: Michael Dove

Forum Theatre was a non-profit theatre company based in Washington, D.C. Founded in 2004 as Forum Theatre and Dance, it worked out of the Warehouse Theatre, the H Street Playhouse and, in its final years, out of a black box theatre in Silver Spring, Maryland. The company focused on plays that featured storytelling and theatricality. The company also aimed to host productions dealing with topics that lent themselves to post-show discussions, which the theatre hosted in the lobby. It was known for producing "new and recent plays at revolutionarily low prices," according to The Washington Post. The Forum Theatre ceased operations on July 31, 2018.

== History ==
Forum Theatre was founded in 2004 by Kelly Bartnik, Michael Dove, Paul Frydrychowski, and Mark W.C. Wright. Instead of using a single performance method, Forum would explore storytelling styles and artistic media. The founders had backgrounds in film, dance/movement, music, visual art, and theatre.

The company also aimed to bring new or seldom-performed plays to Washington, using the shows to promote artistic expression and discussion. The company's first productions were a collection of Samuel Beckett short plays and a movement and video piece called All Things Seen, based on Jean-Paul Sartre's No Exit.

The company performed at the Arena Stage in Washington, Warehouse Theater, Church Street Theater, The University of Maryland, The Kennedy Center Millennium Stage, and Round House Theatre in Silver Spring, Maryland before taking up residence at the H Street Playhouse in northeast DC in June 2007. Its production history includes the world premieres of Israeli playwright Ami Dayan's UpShot and a new translation of The Gas Heart commissioned by the company, along with the DC premieres of Hamletmachine, Václav Havel's The Memorandum, Kid-Simple: A Radio Play in the Flesh, Caryl Churchill's The Skriker, and Don DeLillo's Valparaiso.

In October 2006, Forum founded and produced (with the Irish-American arts organization Solas Nua) the DC Samuel Beckett Centenary Festival, to celebrate the writer's work and impact on contemporary art. The festival, which took place in several DC venues, included two weeks of theatre productions, film screenings, panel discussions, academic symposia, book clubs, downloadable radio play podcasts, and the international touring production of Waiting for Godot by Ireland's Gate Theatre. The festival was sponsored by the Embassy of Ireland, The University of Maryland, and the Kennedy Center for the Performing Arts.

For its 2007–08 season, the company produced Jean Anouilh's Antigone, The Last Days of Judas Iscariot by Stephen Adly Guirgis, and Marat/Sade by Peter Weiss. The group later launched a blog called "OpenForum".

At one point, the group has 16 performers, technicians, and theater administrators, supported by a 13-member board.

The Washington Post noted that Forum was among the first theatres in the D.C. area to both pursue gender parity when selecting which playwrights they performed and to employ a "pay what you want" admission policy.

== Production timeline through 2009 ==
2004-2005

- Beckett: The Shorter Plays (Not I, Footfalls, Breath, Come and Go, Krapp's Last Tape, Rockaby, and Catastrophe)
- All Things Seen (based on Jean-Paul Sartre's No Exit)
- Everyman

2005-2006

- UpShot by Ami Dayan
- The Gas Heart by Tristan Tzara (translated by Steven Perry) and Hamletmachine by Heiner Müller
- The Memorandum by Václav Havel

2006-2007

- DC Beckett Centenary Festival
- The Skriker by Caryl Churchill
- Kid-Simple: A Radio Play in the Flesh by Jordan Harrison
- Valparaiso by Don DeLillo

2007-2008

- Antigone by Jean Anouilh
- The Last Days of Judas Iscariot by Stephen Adly Guirgis
- Marat/Sade by Peter Weiss

2008-2009

- Drunk Enough to Say I Love You? by Caryl Churchill
- The Last Days of Judas Iscariot by Stephen Adly Guirgis
- Marisol by José Rivera
- dark play or stories for boys by Carlos Murillo

== Company members ==
- Kelly Bartnik
- Fiona Blackshaw
- Austin Bragg
- Patrick Bussink
- Jenn Carlson
- Michael Dove
- Paul Frydrychowski
- Maggie Glauber
- Hannah Hessel
- Brent Lowder
- Rose McConnell
- Laura Miller
- Alexander Strain
- Mark Jude Sullivan
- Jesse Terrill
- Mark W.C. Wright

== Awards ==
The Forum Theatre received ten nominations for the Helen Hayes Award.

== See also ==
- Theater in Washington D.C.
- H Street Playhouse
