= Julia Parnell =

New Zealand television producer

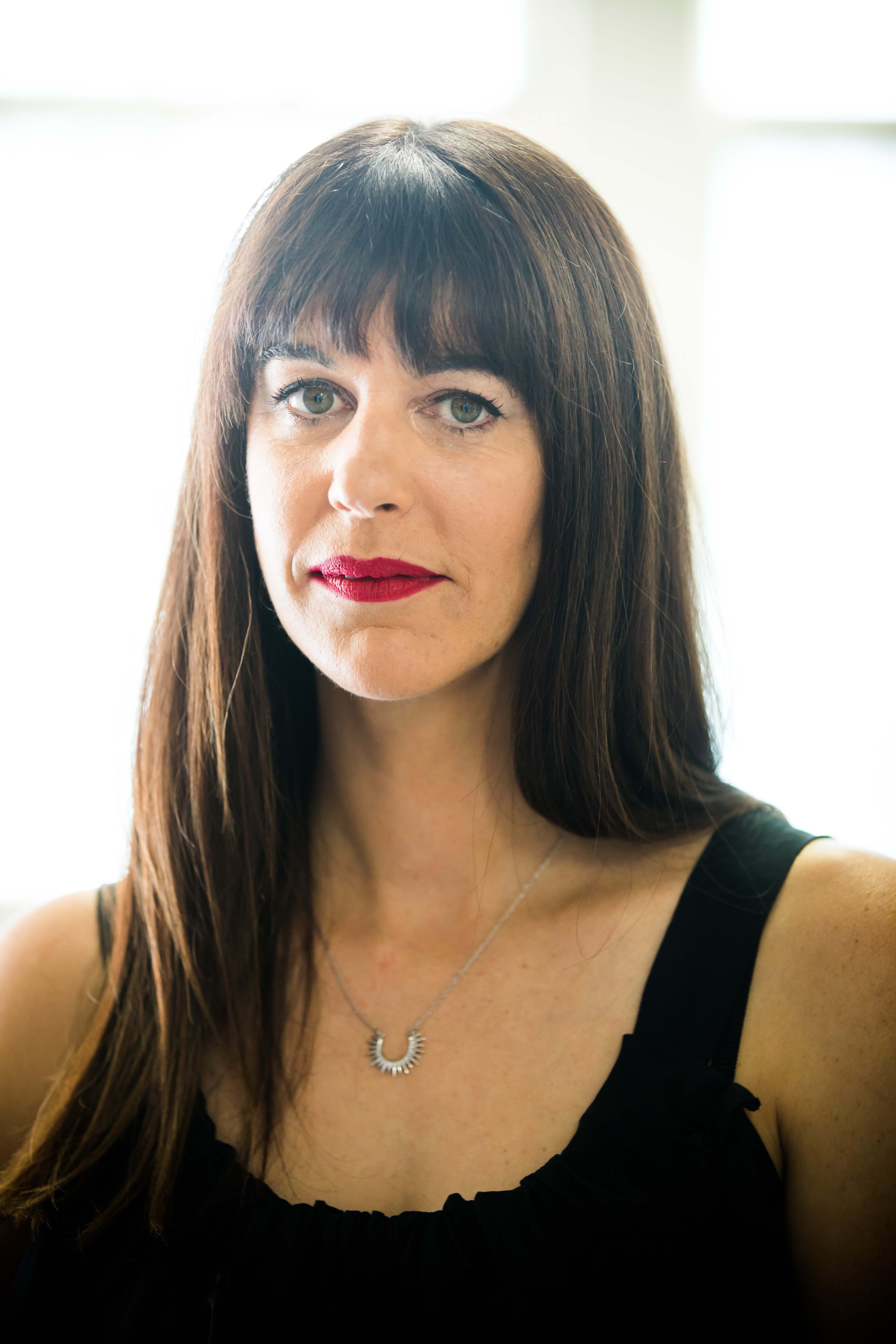
- Julia Parnell
- Born: Nairobi, Kenya
- Citizenship: New Zealand and British
- Occupations: Director, producer, writer
- Years active: 1999–present
- Website: notablepictures.com

Julia Parnell is a New Zealand film and television producer, and director of documentary films. She is head of the production company Notable Pictures.

== Early life and education ==
Julia Parnell was born in Nairobi, Kenya, to a British father and New Zealand mother. The family moved to New Zealand when Parnell was 10.

In 1997 she studied at South Seas Film and Television School in Auckland.

== Career ==
Parnell's career started in 1999. After graduating from film school, she worked at several local production companies. She joined ButoBase Productions (now Buto Productions), gradually working her way up to head the company. She spent six years at the company, overseeing factual series and producing documentaries. These included Ngāti NRL, which explored the "Mozzie" subculture of Māori players in the tough Australian rugby league competition. She also produced a 2009 documentary about American football star Riki Ellison, along with many other titles for Māori Television.

Parnell left Butobase in early July 2010 to start her own production company, Notable Pictures.

Since the opening of Notable Pictures, Parnell has produced many projects, including two series of Bring Your Boots, OZ in collaboration with Māori Television's Glen Osborne, a documentary funded by Māori Television and New Zealand On Air. The series is about Henare O'Keefe, Māori social crusader and District Councilor for Hastings, New Zealand, Both Worlds, a New Zealand On Air-funded documentary series for broadcast on TV3. in which ten second-generation New Zealanders share their experiences of either living a cultural clash or enjoying the best of both worlds, and a one-hour documentary on Māori restorative justice.

Parnell expanded into producing drama with two short films Hitch Hike and Friday Tigers, and a third film, Dive (2014, written and directed by Matthew J. Saville), all three funded by the New Zealand Film Commission.

Parnell produced and directed a documentary funded by Māori Television and New Zealand On Air, Rethinking Rehab, which aimed to provide an insight into the New Zealand Alcohol and Other Drug Treatment Court. She also worked on Loading Docs, a 2013 initiative in collaboration with the New Zealand Film Commission and NZ On Air. The project provides a launchpad for New Zealand documentary shorts, starting with ten three-minute films in 2014 based on the theme of home. Wilbur: The King in the Ring, is a feature documentary co-directed with Jan Oliver Lucks that premiered at Doc Edge in 2017, after starting life as a short film in 2015 for Loading Docs. It tells the story of former pro wrestler Wilbur McDougall, as he battles addiction and undergoes gastric sleeve surgery.

== Recognition and awards ==
- In 2010, Parnell won Great Southern Television's Woman to Watch Award.
- Friday Tigers, written and directed by Aidee Walker, won the New Zealand International Film Festival's Best New Zealand Short Film for 2013.

== Personal life ==
Parnell holds both New Zealand and British citizenship.

== Filmography ==
| Title | Series | Funder/Broadcaster & Date | Series Description |
|---|---|---|---|
| Producer | Rising Dust | New Zealand Film Commission 2013 | Short Film |
| Producer/Director | Rethinking Rehab | Māori Television 2013–14 | Documentary |
| Executive Producer | Loading Docs | New Zealand On Air 2013–14 | Documentary |
| Producer/Director | Both Worlds Series 2 | TV3 (New Zealand) 2013 | Ten-part documentary series |
| Producer | Dive | New Zealand Film Commission 2012 | Short Film |
| Producer | Friday Tigers | New Zealand Film Commission 2012 | Short Film |
| Producer | Restoring Hope | Māori Television 2012 | 52-minute documentary |
| Producer | Both Worlds | TV3 2012 | Ten-part documentary series |
| Producer | Hitch Hike | New Zealand Film Commission 2011 | Short Film |
| Producer | Henare O’Keefe | Māori Television 2011 | 52-minute documentary on Henare O'Keefe |
| Producer | Bring Your Boots, Oz Series 1 & 2 | Māori Television 2011 | Thirteen-part factual entertainment series |
| Producer | O Whakaaro | Māori Television 2010 | Twenty six-part talk show |
| Producer | Hauora an iwi Whanganui | Māori Television 2010 | Thirteen part observational documentary |
| Producer / Director | Minority Voices | TVNZ TV ONE 2009 | Ten-part factual documentary series |
| Producer | Riki Ellison: The Defender | Māori Television 2009 | 60 min documentary |
| Producer / Post Director | Ngāti NRL Series 1 – 10 | Māori Television | Thirteen-part sports entertainment series 2004–09 |
| Producer | Wayne Anderson: Singer of Songs, Series 1 & 2 | TVNZ TV2 & Prime (New Zealand TV channel) 2006 & 2008 | Seven-part comedy series |
| Producer / Post Director | Relocated Mountains | NHK (Japan), Link TV (U.S.), Māori Television 2008 | 60 min documentary |
| Line Producer | Rockin' Rowles | TVNZ TV3 2008 | 60 min Inside the life on John Rowles New Zealand documentary |
| Producer / Director | Kaihoe Wāhine | Māori Television 2008 | Seven-part documentary series |
| Line Producer | Hauora Ngāti Porou | Māori Television 2006 & 2007 | Series 1 & 2 Thirteen-part observational documentary series |
| Producer / Director | Mātātahi | Māori Television 2007 | Seven-part youth magazine series |
| Producer / Writer | Hauora Hokianga, Series 1 & 2 | Māori Television 2004 & 2005 | Thirteen-part observational documentary |
| Producer / Director | Te Haerenga series 1, 2 & 3 | Māori Television 2004 & 2005 | Thirteen part youth documentary series |
| Production coordinator | How's Life? | TVNZ 1 (TV ONE), 2002 | Talk show series by Greenstone TV |
