= IMusical =

Improv comedy show by Washington Improv Theater

iMusical or iMusical: The Improvised Musical!, is an improvised musical production by the Washington Improv Theater (WIT). During each show, the cast creates scenes and songs on-the-spot based on an audience suggestion.

Travis Ploeger (I Eat Pandas, Chicago City Limits) created the show in October 2006 performing at Flashpoint in Washington, DC. In the fall of 2008, the group moved to the Source Theater alongside other WIT productions. In 2009, they did a series of shows at Cape May Stage, in Cape May, NJ.

They have performed at the Baltimore Improv Festival, the Philadelphia Improv Festival and the Del Close Marathon (Upright Citizens Brigade Theater), and in 2007 did a performance at the Kennedy Center.

The Washington Post called the show "amusing," and "spot on," and gives it a coveted "star" recommendation when listed. The website DC Theatre Scene published a feature profile on the production in June 2007.
