= Adventure Theatre =

Children's theatre at Glen Echo Park, Maryland, US

Adventure Theatre (AT) is the longest running children's theatre in the Washington, D.C. area. Located in Glen Echo Park in Glen Echo, Maryland, it has been holding performances since 1951, and educating children in creative drama since 1978.

== History ==
Adventure Theatre was founded in 1951 by a group of women from the Community Arts Association's drama classes.

In 1955, Adventure Theatre began commissioning plays by children's theater playwrights Flora Atkins and Helen Avery.

The In-School Players - a traveling troupe, was launched in 1969 in response to a request by the Director of Language Arts for the District of Columbia Public Schools. The In-School Players remains a vital part of AT programming.

Adventure Theatre moved to Glen Echo Park in 1971 after years of touring.

Between 1974 and 1979, Adventure Theatre expanded programming by partnering with the Junior League to create The Picture Book Players - a performance troupe for pre-school and early elementary-aged children. Adventure Theatre also began offering its first theater-education classes and created a puppet division, now known as The Puppet Co., another resident of Glen Echo Park.

In 1986, New Plays Books published Six Adventure Theatre Plays, which were distributed to bookstores and children's theaters around the country. The County Council of Montgomery County proclaimed June as “Adventure Theatre Month,” in honor of the theater's 35 years of service.

Renovation of the home space was completed in 2007. The extensive renovation now includes a theatre, rehearsal spaces, and room for an expanded administrative staff.

In 2012, AT merged with the Musical Theater Center to form Adventure Theatre MTC. ATMTC fosters collaborations and partnerships with local and national arts, humanities and civic organizations, ensuring that all programming is diverse, affordable and accessible.

== See also ==
- Cultural Alliance of Greater Washington
- League of Washington Theaters
- Theater in Maryland
