= Desire Caught by the Tail =

Play written by Pablo Picasso

- Cover of first English translation, 1948
- Original language: French
- Written by: Pablo Picasso
- Characters: Big Foot, Tart, Round End, Onion, Skinny Anguish, Fat Anguish, the 2 Bow wows, Silence, The Cousin, The Curtains

Premiere
- Date: 1944

Desire Caught by the Tail is a farcical play written by the painter Pablo Picasso.

== History ==
In the winter of 1941, soon after the Germans had occupied Paris, Picasso while ill spent three days writing a play. Written in French, the piece was entitled Le Désir attrapé par la queue, which translates literally to "Desire Caught by the Tail." However, it was not until 1944 that it had its first audience when it was given a reading in the Paris apartment of Michel Leiris. There the parts were read by such local literati as Simone de Beauvoir, Jean-Paul Sartre, Valentine Hugo, Raymond Queneau and Picasso himself. Albert Camus directed the piece.

The Living Theatre made the play a part of their first critical success, when three poetic plays were staged at the same time. It was called An Evening of Bohemian Theatre at the Cherry Lane Theatre in Greenwich Village, 2 March 1952, and also included plays by Gertrude Stein and T.S. Eliot. In June, 1959, Lorees Yerby directed a version of the play at the Coffee House Positano in Malibu, California. It premiered as a full staged production in 1967, in St. Tropez, France. The show, which was rumored (falsely) to have actors urinating on stage, was protested despite the town's generally tolerant reputation. The central prop was a large black box, which served as a bathtub, a coffin and a bed. In November 1969, an off-Broadway production, simply titled "Desire...," was briefly presented at Theatre East in New York City, featuring a young actor billed as Mike Stallone in the role of "Big Foot" prior to his stardom as Sylvester Stallone. Desire Caught by the Tail was restaged in 1984 (with David Hockney acting) by the Guggenheim Museum. It has been rarely produced since.

== Description ==
Described as "surrealistic" and "simply weird," the play is rarely produced due to sheer incomprehensibility. There is no plot to speak of. The play has abstractly named characters: besides the protagonist Big Foot and his love interest Tart, there are Onion, Round End, the Cousin, the two Bow-wows, Silence, Fat Anguish, Skinny Anguish and The Curtains. And the stage directions are highly impractical: the transparent doors light up and the dancing shadows of five monkeys eating carrots appear. Complete darkness.

While the narrative is nonlinear and the meaning nearly impossible to decipher, the work has been praised despite (and sometimes for) its lack of message. Bernard Frechtman, who translated the work from the original French, writes in his foreword, "It says nothing of human destiny or of the human condition. In an age which has discovered man with a capital M, it is gratifying to advise the reader that Picasso has nothing to say of man, nor of the universe. This in itself is a considerable achievement."

== Noteworthy productions ==
- Eye and Ear Theater, 1984. Two day production in New York.
- Envision Theatre, 2002. Produced as a radio broadcast in the UK.
- Banished? productions, 2006. D.C production featured characters portrayed by dancers and puppeteer-powered toilet bowls
- Luxe, 2016. Two-day production in London.
