= Theater Alliance =

Theater Alliance of Washington, DC
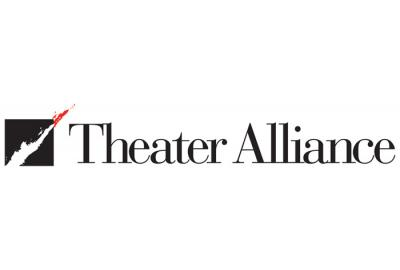
- Formation: 2000
- Type: Theatre group
- Location: 340 Maple Drive SW, Washington, DC, 20024
- Artistic director: Shanara Gabrielle
- Website: http://www.theateralliance.com

Theater Alliance is a non-profit professional theater in Washington, DC, professionally incorporated in 2000 with the goal of producing work that would illuminate the experiences, philosophies and interests of DC's diverse population. That goal was furthered in 2002, when Theater Alliance moved from its home at the Capitol Hill Arts Workshop to become the sole theater-in-residence at the H Street Playhouse. Once the H Street Playhouse closed, Theater Alliance moved to Southeast DC in 2013 to become the theatre-in-residence at the Anacostia Playhouse. In 2024, Theater Alliance began operating from a new space within a mixed-use development in Southwest Washington.

Theater Alliance was under the leadership of Producing Artistic Director Colin Hovde from 2011 to 2019. In January 2019, actor, director, and teaching artist, Raymond O. Caldwell was named Producing Artistic Director. In 2024, just before the relocation from Anacostia Playhouse, Shanara Gabrielle was named Producing Artistic Director.

As of 2025, it has produced more than 20 seasons.

== Relocation from Anacostia ==
In 2024, it was revealed that the organization doing business as Anacostia Playhouse was being evicted from the building it operated in due to non-payment of rent. Theater Alliance was operating through them via an unlawful sublet which they were led to believe was proper, as well as without the proper occupancy licenses. Despite negotiating a move-out plan with the building, Theater Alliance were prematurely forced out and prevented from accessing the offices or belongings of employees. Following this, Theater Alliance relocated to a temporary "pop-up" space beneath a new mixed-use development near the Waterfront metro in Southwest Washington in December 2024. In 2025, Theater Alliance announced $4.5 million plans to permanently lease this space and turn it into an artistic hub in the neighborhood.

== Current and Recent Productions ==
=== Season 15: 2017 - 2018 ===
- Word Becomes Flesh by Marc Bamuthi Joseph
- The Word Becomes Action Festival
- The Raid by Idris Goodwin
- Flood City by Gabrielle Reisman

=== Season 14: 2016 - 2017 ===
- Still Life with Rocket by Mollye Maxner
- Mnemonic by Complicité
- The Planet Earth Arts New Play Festival
- Black Nativity by Langston Hughes
- brownsville song (b-side for tray) by Kimber Lee

=== Season 13: 2015 - 2016 ===
- Night Falls on the Blue Planet by Kathleen Akerley
- Black Nativity by Langston Hughes
- for colored girls who have considered suicide / when the rainbow is enuf by Ntozake Shange
- Word Becomes Flesh by Marc Bamuthi Joseph
- Going to a Place Where You Already Are by Bekah Brunstetter

=== Season 12: 2014 - 2015 ===
- Spark by Caridad Svich
- Black Nativity by Langston Hughes
- Dontrell, Who Kissed the Sea by Nathan Alan Davis
- Occupied Territories, by Mollye Maxner and Nancy Bannon

== Award ==
Overall, the company has earned more than 80 Helen Hayes Award nominations and 13 Helen Hayes Awards, including:s

- 2017 - Outstanding Ensemble in a Play, Word Becomes Flesh
- 2017 - Outstanding Direction of a Play, Word Becomes Flesh
- 2017 - Outstanding Play, Word Becomes Flesh
- 2016 - Outstanding Choreography in a Play, Occupied Territories
- 2015 - Outstanding Ensemble in a Play, Black Nativity
- 2015 - Outstanding Musical, Black Nativity
- 2015 - Outstanding Director of a Play, The Wonderful World of Dissocia
- 2015 - Outstanding Play, The Wonderful World of Dissocia
