= Brave Spirits Theatre =

Theater in Arlington, Virginia, US (e. 2011)

- Company logo
- Formation: 2011
- Type: Theatre group
- Purpose: visceral and intimate productions of Shakespeare and his contemporaries with a focus on female artists and feminist perspectives
- Location: Arlington, VA
- Artistic director: Charlene V. Smith
- Website: www.bravespiritstheatre.com

Brave Spirits Theatre was a small, non-Equity theater based in Arlington, VA. The company was founded in 2011 by Charlene V. Smith and Victoria Reinsel. Brave Spirits was a “feminist-leaning classics troupe”, which produces plays by Shakespeare and his contemporaries, the era of “verse and violence”. The company regularly cast women in traditionally male roles. In doing so, the roles are often fully re-gendered: for example, in the company's repertory production of Henry IV, Part I and Henry IV, Part II (styled as Henri IV, Part I and Henri IV, Part II), the lead characters were portrayed as Queen Henri IV, Princess Hallie, and Dame Jill Falstaff, with Doll Tearsheet switched to Dick Tearsheet. In late 2020, it was announced that due to the Covid-19 pandemic, Brave Spirits Theatre would be shutting down, with the company's final project being audio recordings of the 8 shows that they were producing before Covid-19.

== History ==
Brave Spirits' first production was The Two Gentlemen of Verona in 2011 at The Fridge DC, in the Eastern Market area of Washington, DC. Subsequent productions included Richard III in 2012, and a repertory production of A Midsummer Night's Dream and Two Noble Kinsmen in 2014, all at the Atlas Performing Arts Center in Anacostia.

In 2015, the company began their residence at The Convergence in Arlington, VA, with a repertory production of Henry IV, Part I and Henry IV, Part II.

== Repertories and area premieres ==
Brave Spirits regularly produced pairs of plays in repertory, and they regularly staged area premieres of plays by Shakespeare's contemporaries.

In 2014, the company produced A Midsummer Night's Dream and Two Noble Kinsmen in repertory at the Anacostia Arts Center in southeast Washington, DC. (According to the company, this was the first full production of Two Noble Kinsmen in the Washington area.)

In 2015, the company produced their regendered production of Henry IV, Part I and Henry IV, Part II in repertory.

In 2017, the company produced their “Incest Rep”, comprising A King and No King, by Francis Beaumont and John Fletcher; and 'Tis Pity She's a Whore by John Ford. (According to Brave Spirits, A King and No King had never been staged professionally in the D. C. area.)

== Shakespeare's history tetralogies ==
In 2020, Brave Spirits was planning a repertory production of Shakepeare's two history tetralogies: the Henriad, or major tetralogy, comprising Richard II; Henry IV, Part 1; Henry IV, Part 2; and Henry V; and the minor tetralogy, consisting of Henry VI, Part 1; Henry VI, Part 2; Henry VI, Part 3; and Richard III. This will be the first time that all eight plays have been mounted and performed in repertory in a single season by U.S. company.

== See also ==
- Theater in Washington D.C.
