= Warner Theatre (Washington, D.C.) =

Theatre in downtown Washington, D.C

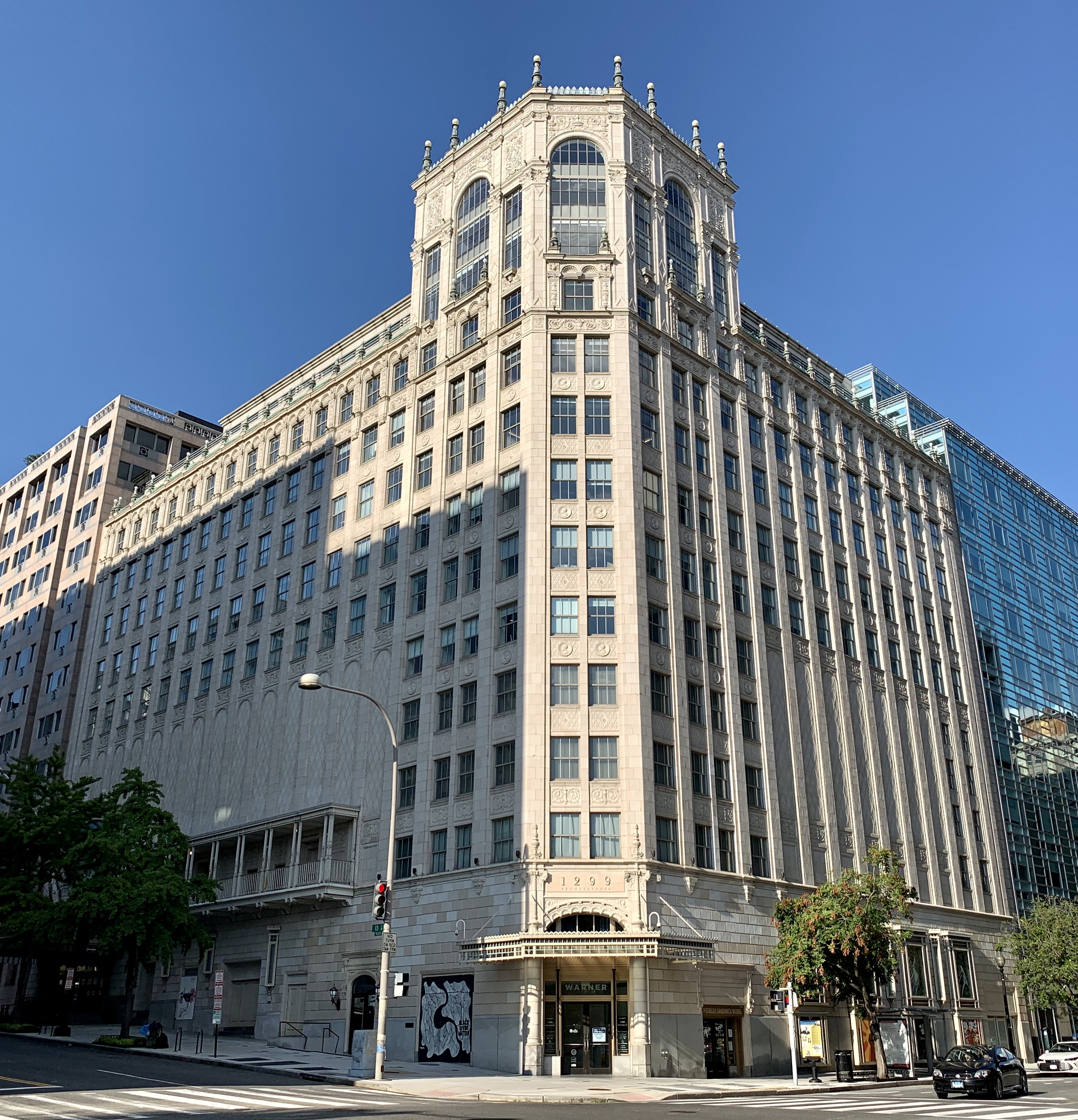
- The Warner Building in 2020
- Interactive map of Warner Theatre
- Address: 513 13th Street, N.W. Washington, D.C. United States
- Coordinates: 38.8963°N 77.0292°W
- Owner: CBRE Global Investors
- Operator: Live Nation
- Capacity: 1,847
- Current use: Music venue

Construction
- Opened: 1924
- Closed: 1989
- Reopened: 1992
- Architects: C. Howard Crane & Kenneth Franzheim II

Website
- Official Website

Warner Theatre is a theatre located at 513 13th Street, N.W. in downtown Washington, D.C. The theatre is part of an office building called the Warner Building located on 1299 Pennsylvania Avenue.

== History ==
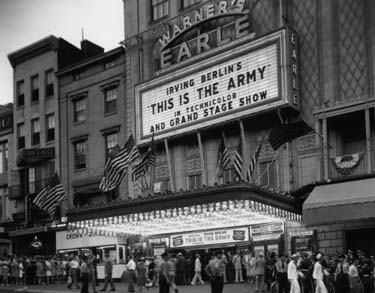
This is the Army first premiered at the theatre in 1943.

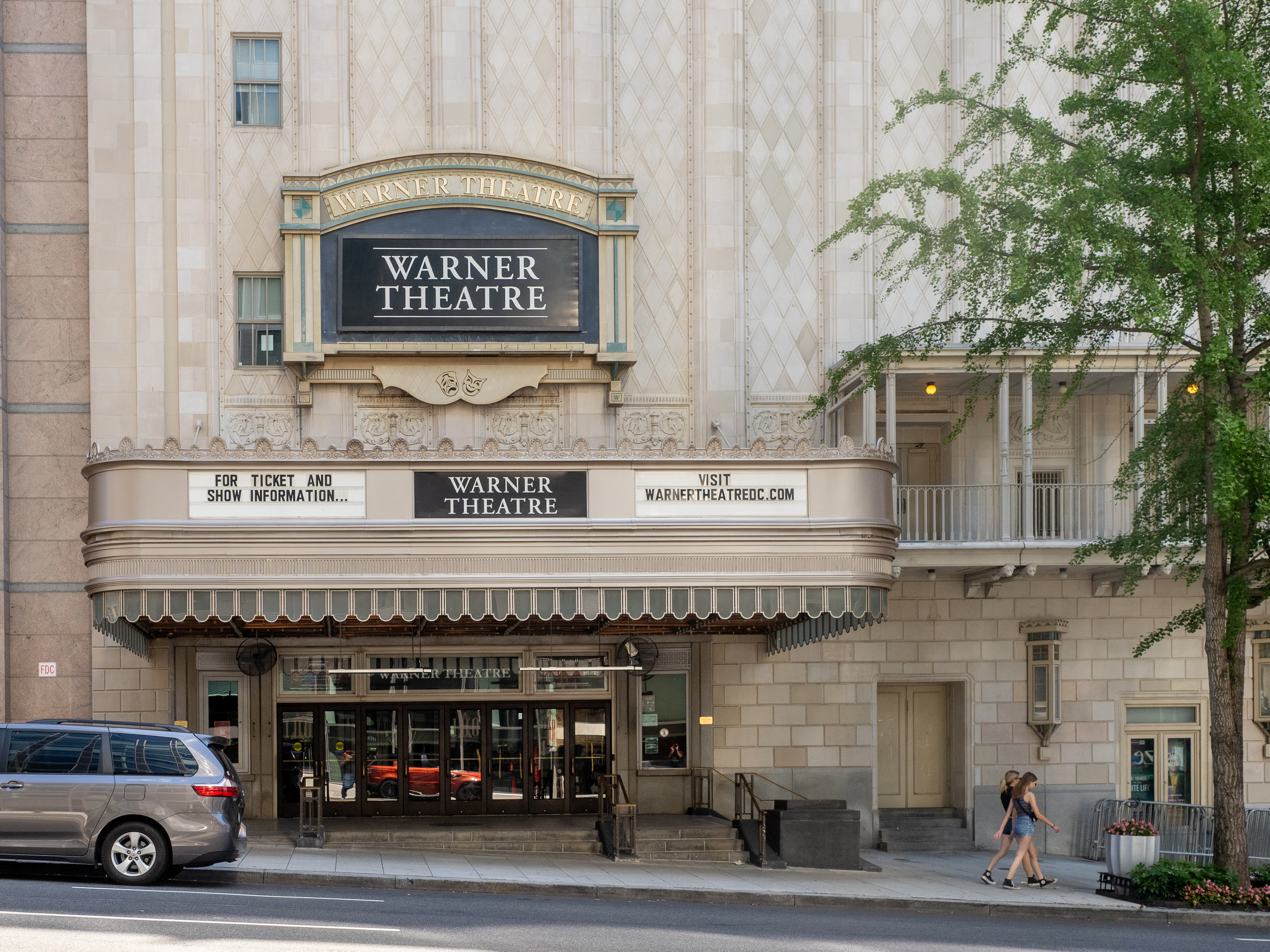
The theatre in 2024

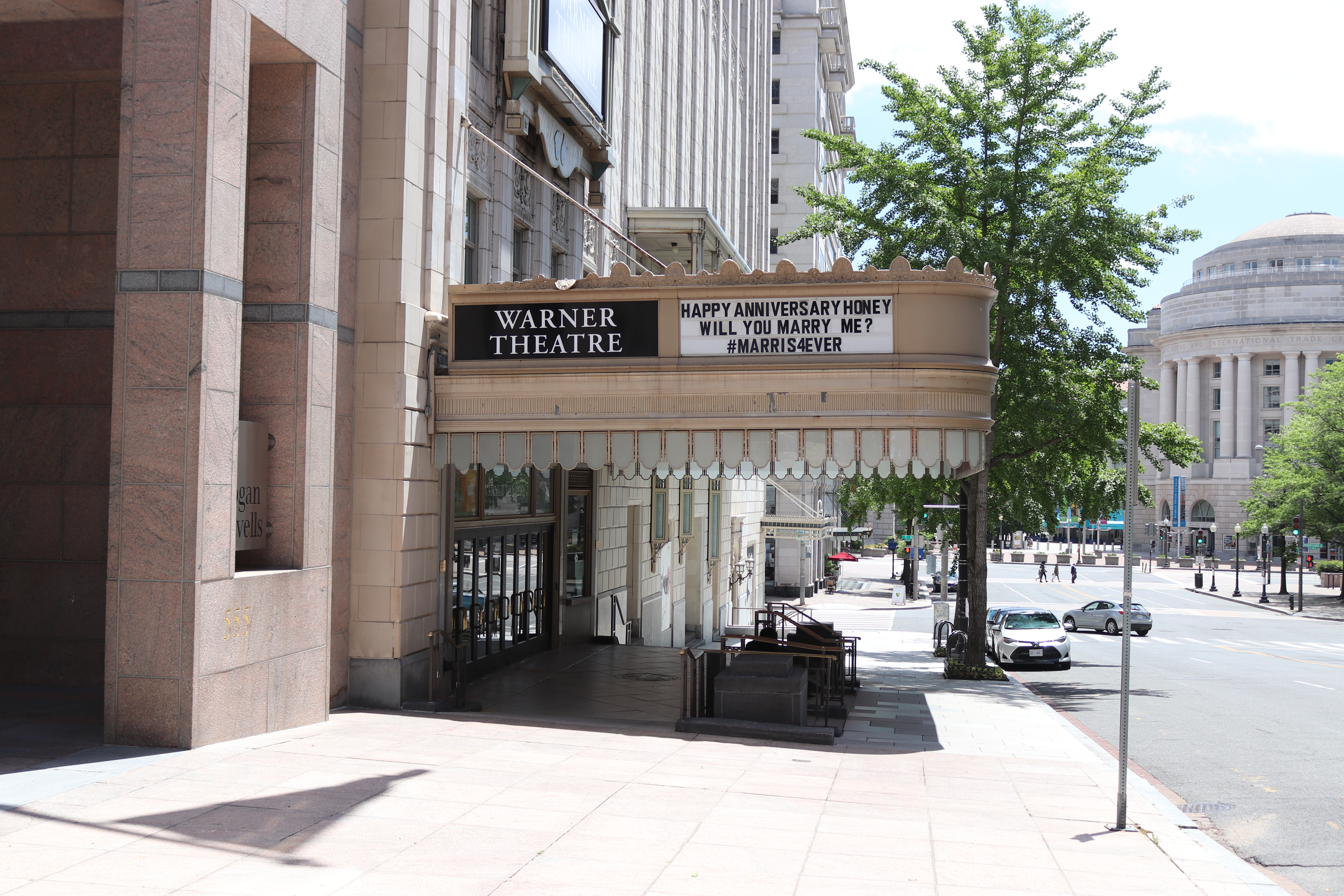
The theatre's kiosk in 2020

The Warner Theatre was originally developed by Aaron and Julian Brylawski in 1922. Originally named the Earle Theatre, it was built in 1924 as a movie palace presenting live vaudeville and first-run silent movies. It was designed by theatre architect C. Howard Crane of Detroit and Kenneth Franzheim. The Earle Theatre opened December 27, 1924. It had a rooftop garden, basement ballroom, and restaurant. It was said to be "just about the last word in theatre construction, a thing of beauty, a valuable addition to the architectural wealth of the nation's capital." In the 1930s, the basement of the theatre had a restaurant called the Neptune Room.

On August 12, 1943, the movie This Is the Army premiered there. In 1945, the theatre began showing movies exclusively.

The Earle featured its own precision dance troupe – much like the still-famous Rockettes – called the Roxyettes. They would perform before and after films until 1945. They had guest performances by Red Skelton and Jerry Lewis.

The theatre was renamed in 1947 in honor of its owner, Harry Warner, one of the founders of Warner Brothers. Harry Warner was said to have commented "I own that theatre. Put my name up there!"

Some of the biggest acts of the 1930s and 1940s came to the theatre, including Bob Hope, Jack Benny, Sophie Tucker, and Duke Ellington.

In the 1950s the theatre was redesigned for Cinerama movies. In the 1960s they showed such films as Ben-Hur, Doctor Zhivago, and Hello, Dolly!. By the 1970s, the Warner Theatre had fallen into disrepair and was briefly used to screen pornographic films before being revived as a live concert venue.

On June 15, 1978, The Rolling Stones performed a secret show at the theatre. Although the only notice given was on the building's marquee the morning before the show, all seats were quickly sold out.

The Warner Theatre closed for renovations in 1989. The Kaempfer Company's $10 million renovations restored the theatre back to its original splendor. The renovations included custom upholstery to match the originals, custom draperies from Portugal, gilt adorning the walls and ceiling, modern production, sound, and lighting equipment, and access to the parking garage. The theatre reopened in October 1992. Frank Sinatra performed for the reopening ceremony. It was his last DC performance before his death in 1998.

In 2007, it was the venue for the first annual Library of Congress Gershwin Prize for Popular Song. The recipient of the first Gershwin Prize was Paul Simon.

On December 28, 2018, JBG Smith sold the property to CBRE Global Investors for $376.5 million.

The theatre was also home to The BET Honors ceremony, held annually.

The Warner Theatre has the long running tradition of having The Washington Ballet's performance of The Nutcracker every December.

Many other famous acts have played the venue over the years including David Letterman, Liza Minnelli, Shirley MacLaine, David Copperfield, Patti LaBelle, Bob Newhart, Prince, Bob Dylan, Gladys Knight, Kenny Rogers, Eddie Izzard, Tony Bennett, Jon Stewart, Jay-Z, Eddie Vedder, Johnny Cash, Jerry Garcia, John Kahn, David Chappelle, George Carlin, Kraftwerk, Pat Metheny, Joe Russo's Almost Dead, Ornette Coleman and B.B. King.

In front of the theatre is a Walk of Fame with numerous signatures from visiting artists.

== See also ==
- Theater in Washington, D.C.
- House of Blues
