= Hexagon (comedy show) =

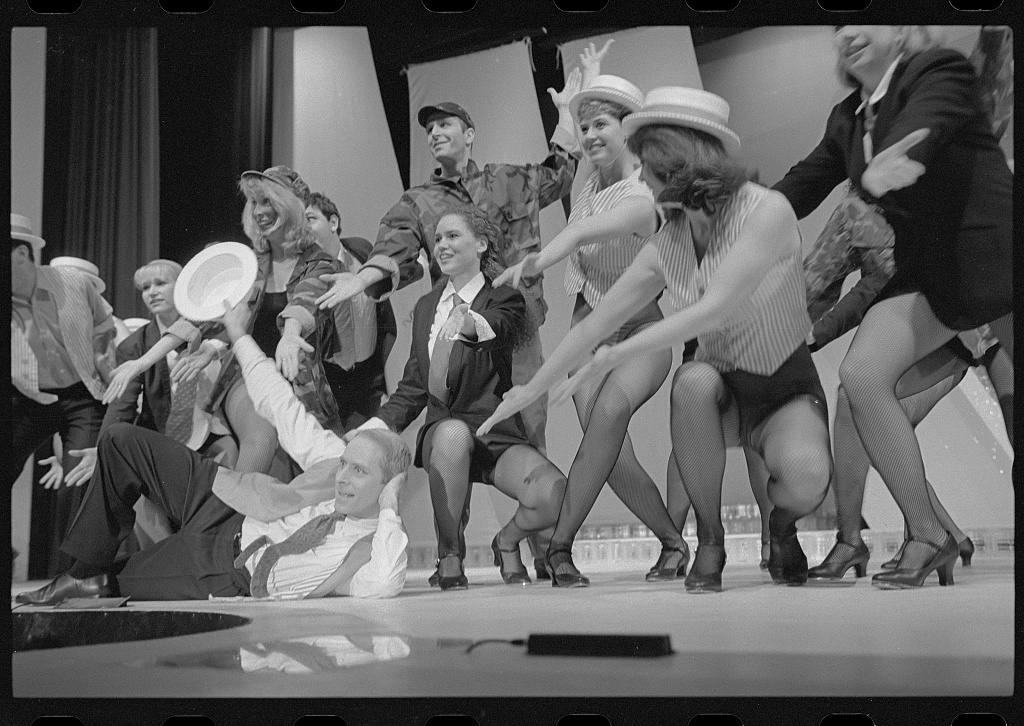
Hexagon Theater performers on stage in 2000

Hexagon is a non-profit organization billing itself as "Washington's only original political, satirical, musical, comedy revue." Since 1955, it has produced an annual show that parodies local, national and international political and social issues. Performances were previously held at the Duke Ellington School of the Arts in Washington and are currently located at the Montgomery College Cultural Arts Center in Silver Spring. Beginning in 2015, the show will return to Washington at Woodrow Wilson High School.

All Hexagon performers and staff are volunteers, including local celebrities who make cameo appearances. Ticket sales are donated to a charity selected each year. Recent recipients have included Sarah's Circle, the ALS Association, Hospice Caring, and the Wounded Warrior Project. Hexagon is supported by the affiliated Friends of Hexagon. As of 2014, Hexagon had raised over $3.5 million for charity.

Hexagon has received recognition for its work in the Washington community. In 1987, President Ronald Reagan presented Hexagon with the President's Volunteer Action Award for service. In 1993, Washingtonian magazine selected Hexagon as "Washingtonian of the Year," the first time an organization was named as the award's recipient. In 1994, the Greater Washington Area Chapter of Hadassah honored Hexagon with its Myrtle Wreath Award. The 2007 show "Strike While The Irony's Hot" was featured in the Capitol Hill newspaper Roll Call. The 2010 show "Dancing with the Czars" was featured in the Maryland Gazette newspapers.

== See also ==
- Theater in Washington D.C.
