= Constellation Theatre Company =

US non-profit theater company

- Constellation Theatre Company Logo
- Formation: 2007
- Type: Theatre group
- Location: Washington, D.C.
- Artistic director: Allison Arkell Stockman (Founding Artistic Director)
- Website: www.constellationtheatre.org

Constellation Theatre Company is a non-profit theater company located in Washington, D.C., performing at the Source Theatre, a black box theatre. Since its founding in 2007, Constellation has received several Helen Hayes Awards, including the John Aniello Award for Outstanding Emerging Theatre Company in 2009.

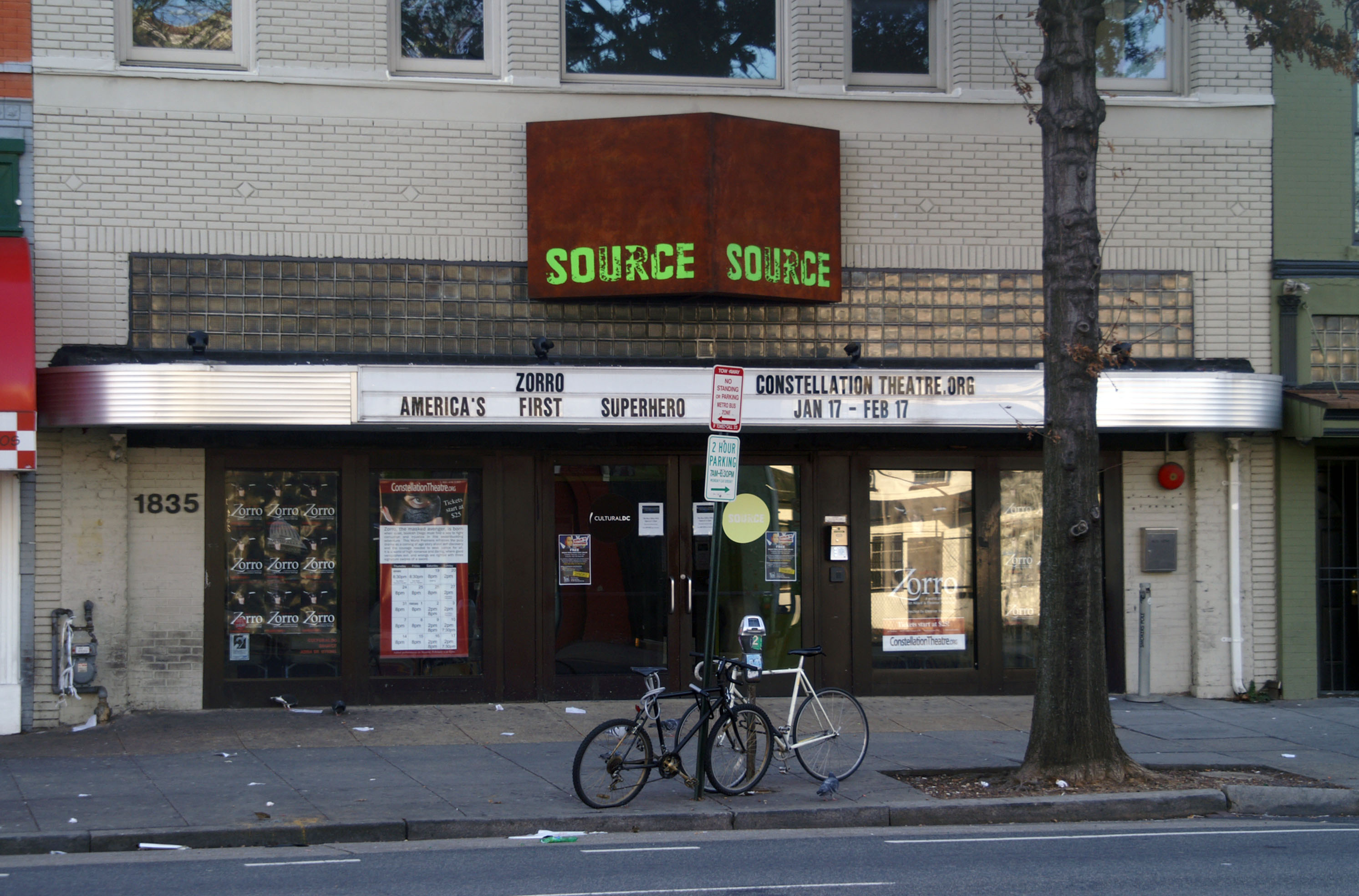
The Source Theater, Washington, D.C., during the run of Constellation Theatre Company's production of Zorro

== Artistic leadership ==
Constellation Theatre Company's founding artistic director is Allison Arkell Stockman. Stockman was a freelance director in Washington, D.C., and New York City. In 2006, she quit her job as a teacher, and started the theater company in 2007.

A.J. Guban has been managing director and designer on multiple productions since the founding of the company.

== Productions ==
=== Current productions ===
2024-2025 Season: Infinite Possiblities
- Constellations by Nick Payne
- Head Over Heels with songs by The Go-Go's, based on The Arcadia by Sir Philip Sidney, conceived and original book by Jeff Whitty and adapted by James Magruder

=== Production history ===
2019-2020 Season
- Little Shop of Horrors with book and lyrics by Howard Ashman and music by Alan Menken
- The 39 Steps adapted by Patrick Barlow from the movie by Alfred Hitchcock and the novel by John Buchan
- Eurydice by Sarah Ruhl
Note: Eurydice was announced but cancelled due to the COVID-19 pandemic.

2018–2019 Season: Epic Love
- Melancholy Play: A Contemporary Farce by Sarah Ruhl
- Aida with music by Elton John, lyrics by Tim Rice, and book by Linda Woolverton, Robert Falls, and David Henry Hwang
- The Master and Margarita adapted by Edward Kemp
- The White Snake by Mary Zimmerman, based on the Chinese legend of the white snake
2017–2018 Season: Survival Instincts
- The Cabinet of Dr. Caligari, the silent film with live music by Tom Teasley
- The Wild Party with book, lyrics, and music by Andrew Lippa
- The Skin of Our Teeth by Thornton Wilder
- The Caucasian Chalk Circle by Bertolt Brecht
2016–2017 Season
- Metropolis, the silent film with live music by Tom Teasley
- Urinetown music and lyrics by Mark Hollmann, book and lyrics by Greg Kotis
- Peter and the Starcatcher by Rick Elice
- The Arabian Nights by Mary Zimmerman
2015–2016 Season: Playtime for Grownups
- The Adventures of Prince Achmed by Lotte Reiniger with live music by Tom Teasley
- Avenue Q music and lyrics by Robert Lopez and Jeff Marx, book by Jeff Whitty
- Equus by Peter Shaffer
- Journey to the West by Mary Zimmerman, based on the 16th century Chinese novel Journey to the West
2014–2015 Season
- Right You Are (if you think so) by Luigi Pirandello, adapted by Martin Sherman
- The Lieutenant of Inishmore by Martin McDonagh
- The Fire and the Rain, by Girish Karnad and drawn from The Mahabharata

2013–2014 Season
- 36 Views by Naomi Iizuka
- Scapin by Bill Irwin and Mark O'Donnell adapted from Les Fourberies de Scapin by Molière
- The Love of the Nightingale, by Timberlake Wertenbaker

2012–2013 Season
- Taking Steps by Alan Ayckbourn
- Zorro^{*} by Janet Allard and Eleanor Holdridge
- Gilgamesh, Poetry by Yusef Komunyakaa, concept & dramaturgy by Chad Gracia

2011–2012 Season
- The Ramayana (remount)
- Arms and the Man
- Blood Wedding
- Metamorphoses

2010–2011 Season
- Women Beware Women
- On The Razzle
- The Green Bird

2009–2010 Season
- A Flea in Her Ear
- Three Sisters
- The Ramayana

2008–2009 Season
- Temptation
- The Marriage of Figaro
- Crazyface

2007–2008 Season
- A Dream Play by August Strindberg adapted by Caryl Churchill
- The Arabian Nights by Mary Zimmerman
- The Good Woman of Setzuan
- The Oresteia

^{*} denotes world premiere

== Grants ==
In September 2013, the American Theatre Wing (the founder of the Tony Awards) awarded a National Theatre Company Grant to Constellation Theatre. The grant is for general operating support to companies that "have articulated a distinctive mission, cultivated an audience, and nurtured a community of artists in ways that strengthen and demonstrate the quality, diversity, and dynamism of American theatre".

== Awards ==
In 2009, Constellation received the John Aniello Award for Outstanding Emerging Theatre Company.

Constellation has received 90 competitive Helen Hayes Award nominations and has received 19 of these awards.

Helen Hayes Awards
Year	Category	Recipient(s)	Results
2024	Outstanding Set Design - HELEN	Sarah Reed, The School for Lies	Nominated
2024	Outstanding Ensemble in a Play - HELEN	The School For Lies	Nominated
2024	Outstanding Costume Design - HELEN	Frank Labovitz, The School for Lies	Recipient
2023	Outstanding Production in a Musical - HELEN	Once On This Island	Nominated
2023	Outstanding Musical Direction - HELEN	Elisa Rosman & Refiye Tappan, Once On This Island	Nominated
2023	Outstanding Direction in a Musical - HELEN	Angelisa Gillyard, Once On This Island	Nominated
2023	Outstanding Choreography in a Musical - HELEN	Maurice Johnson, Once on This Island	Nominated
2020	Outstanding Supporting Performer in a Musical - HELEN	Marty Austin Lamar, Little Shop of Horrors	Nominated
2020	Outstanding Supporting Performer in a Musical - HELEN	Alana Thomas, Little Shop of Horrors	Nominated
2020	Outstanding Supporting Performer in a Musical - HELEN	Chani Wereley, Little Shop of Horrors	Nominated
2020	Outstanding Sound Design - HELEN	Tom Teasley & Chao Tian, The White Snake	Nominated
2020	Outstanding Set Design - HELEN	A.J. Guban, "Little Shop of Horrors"	Nominated
2020	Outstanding Production in a Musical - HELEN	Little Shop of Horrors	Nominated
2020	Outstanding Musical Direction - HELEN	Walter "Bobby" McCoy, Little Shop of Horrors	Nominated
2020	Outstanding Lead Performer in a Musical - HELEN	Christian Montgomery, Little Shop of Horrors	Nominated
2020	Outstanding Ensemble in a Musical - HELEN	Little Shop of Horrors	Nominated
2020	Outstanding Direction in a Musical - HELEN	Nick Martin, Little Shop of Horrors	Nominated
2020	Outstanding Costume Design- HELEN	Frank Labovitz, Little Shop of Horrors	Recipient
2020	Outstanding Choreography in a Musical- HELEN	Ilona Kessell, Little Shop of Horrors	Recipient
2019	Outstanding Supporting Actor in a Musical - HELEN	Da'von Moody, Aida	Nominated
2019	Outstanding Sound Design - HELEN	Gordon Nimmo-Smith (Sound Designer), Brian Lotter & Matthew Schleigh (Composers), The Caucasian Chalk Circle	Nominated
2019	Outstanding Set Design - HELEN	A.J. Guban, The Caucasian Chalk Circle	Nominated
2019	Outstanding Production in a Play - HELEN	Melancholy Play: A Contemporary Farce	Recipient
2019	Outstanding Musical Direction - HELEN	Walter "Bobby" McCoy, Aida	Nominated
2019	Outstanding Lead Actress in a Play - HELEN	Tonya Beckman, The Skin of Our Teeth	Nominated
2019	Outstanding Lead Actress in a Play - HELEN	Billie Krishawn, Melancholy Play: A Contemporary Farce	Nominated
2019	Outstanding Lead Actress in a Musical - HELEN	Shayla Simmons, Aida	Nominated
2019	Outstanding Ensemble in a Play - HELEN	Melancholy Play: A Contemporary Farce	Nominated
2019	Outstanding Direction in a Play - HELEN	Nick Martin, Melancholy Play: A Contemporary Farce	Recipient
2019	Outstanding Costume Design - HELEN	Kelsey Hunt, The Caucasian Chalk Circle	Recipient
2019	James MacArthur Award for Outstanding Supporting Actor in a Play - HELEN	Scott Abernathy, The Caucasian Chalk Circle	Nominated
2018	Outstanding Supporting Actress in a Musical - HELEN	Kari Ginsburg, The Wild Party	Recipient
2018	Outstanding Sound Design - HELEN	Justin Schmitz, The Wild Party	Nominated
2018	Outstanding Sound Design - HELEN	Tom Teasley, The Arabian Nights	Nominated
2018	Outstanding Set Design - HELEN	Tony Cisek, The Wild Party	Nominated
2018	Outstanding Set Design - HELEN	A.J. Guban, The Arabian Nights	Nominated
2018	Outstanding Production in a Musical - HELEN	The Wild Party	Nominated
2018	Outstanding Musical Direction - HELEN	Walter "Bobby" McCoy, The Wild Party	Nominated
2018	Outstanding Lighting Design - HELEN	A.J. Guban, The Wild Party	Nominated
2018	Outstanding Lead Actress in a Play - HELEN	Megan Graves, Peter and the Starcatcher	Nominated
2018	Outstanding Lead Actor in a Musical - HELEN	Jimmy Mavrikes, The Wild Party	Nominated
2018	Outstanding Ensemble in a Play - HELEN	Peter and the Starcatcher	Recipient
2018	Outstanding Ensemble in a Musical - HELEN	The Wild Party	Nominated
2018	Outstanding Direction in a Musical - HELEN	Allison Arkell Stockman, The Wild Party	Nominated
2018	Outstanding Costume Design - HELEN	Erik Teague, The Arabian Nights	Nominated
2018	Outstanding Costume Design - HELEN	Erik Teague, The Wild Party	Nominated
2018	Outstanding Choreography in a Musical - HELEN	Ilona Kessell, The Wild Party	Nominated
2018	James MacArthur Award for Outstanding Supporting Actor in a Play - HELEN	Jordan Campbell, Peter and the Starcatcher	Nominated
2018	James MacArthur Award for Outstanding Supporting Actor in a Play - HELEN	Matt Dewberry, Peter and the Starcatcher	Nominated
2018	James MacArthur Award for Outstanding Supporting Actor in a Play - HELEN	Alex Vernon, Peter and the Starcatcher	Nominated
2017	Robert Prosky Award for Outstanding Lead Actors in a Play - HELEN	Dallas Tolentino, Journey to the West	Nominated
2017	Outstanding Supporting Actress in a Play - HELEN	Justine Icy Moral, Journey to the West	Nominated
2017	Outstanding Supporting Actress in a Musical - HELEN	Jenna Berk, Urinetown	Nominated
2017	Outstanding Supporting Actor in a Musical - HELEN	Matt Dewberry, Urinetown	Nominated
2017	Outstanding Sound Design - HELEN	Palmer Hefferan, Equus	Nominated
2017	Outstanding Sound Design - HELEN	Tom Teasley, Journey to the West	Recipient
2017	Outstanding Set Design - HELEN	A.J. Guban, Journey to the West	Nominated
2017	Outstanding Play - HELEN	Equus	Nominated
2017	Outstanding Musical - HELEN	Urinetown	Nominated
2017	Outstanding Musical Direction - HELEN	Urinetown	Nominated
2017	Outstanding Lighting Design - HELEN	Colin K. Bills, Journey to the West	Nominated
2017	Outstanding Direction, Musical - HELEN	Allison Arkell Stockman, Urinetown	Nominated
2017	Outstanding Costume Design - HELEN	Kendra Rai, Journey to the West	Nominated
2017	Outstanding Choreography, Musical - HELEN	Ilona Kessel, Urinetown	Nominated
2017	James MacArthur Award for Outstanding Supporting Actor in a Play - HELEN	Ryan Tumulty, Journey to the West	Nominated
2016	Outstanding Supporting Actress in a Musical - HELEN	Jenna Berk, Avenue Q	Nominated
2016	Outstanding Supporting Actress in a Musical - HELEN	Justine Icy Moral, Avenue Q	Nominated
2016	Outstanding Supporting Actress in a Musical - HELEN	Emily Zickler, Avenue Q	Recipient
2016	Outstanding Supporting Actor in a Musical - HELEN	Mikey Cafarelli, Avenue Q	Nominated
2016	Outstanding Supporting Actor in a Musical - HELEN	Vaughn Ryan Midder, Avenue Q	Recipient
2016	Outstanding Sound Design - HELEN	Tom Teasley, The Fire and The Rain	Nominated
2016	Outstanding Musical - HELEN	Avenue Q	Recipient
2016	Outstanding Musical Direction - HELEN	Jack Null, Avenue Q	Recipient
2016	Outstanding Lighting Design - HELEN	A.J. Guban, Avenue Q	Nominated
2016	Outstanding Lead Actress in a Musical - HELEN	Katy Carkuff, Avenue Q	Recipient
2016	Outstanding Lead Actor in a Musical - HELEN	Matt Dewberry, Avenue Q	Nominated
2016	Outstanding Ensemble in a Musical - HELEN	Avenue Q	Recipient
2016	Outstanding Director of a Musical - HELEN	Allison Arkell Stockman, Avenue Q	Recipient
2016	Outstanding Costume Design - HELEN	Kara Waala, Avenue Q	Nominated
2016	Outstanding Choreography in a Play - HELEN	Casey Kaleba & Matthew R. Wilson, The Lieutenant of Inishmore	Nominated
2016	Outstanding Choreography in a Musical - HELEN	Rachel Leigh Dolan, Avenue Q	Nominated
2015	Outstanding Sound Design - HELEN	Tom Teasley, The Love of the Nightingale	Nominated
2014	Outstanding Set Design, Resident Production	A.J. Guban, 36 Views	Nominated
2014	Outstanding Lighting Design, Resident Production	A.J. Guban, 36 Views	Nominated
2013	The James MacArthur Award for Outstanding Supporting Actor, Resident Play	Matthew Aldwin McGee, Taking Steps	Recipient
2012	Outstanding Sound Design, Resident Production	Tom Teasley, Green Bird	Nominated
2012	Outstanding Costume Design, Resident Production	Kendra Rai, Green Bird	Nominated
2011	Outstanding Sound Design, Resident Production	Tom Teasley, The Ramayana	Recipient
2010	Outstanding Sound Design, Resident Production	Tom Teasley, Crazyface	Recipient

The Constellation Theatre Company was nominated for the following Audience Choice Awards

- 2008 Crazyface (Favorite Ensemble)
- 2009 Three Sisters (Favorite Plays, Favorite Actress in a Play)
- 2013 Taking Steps (Best Play, Best Actor in a Play), Zorro (Best Ensemble Cast, Best Actor in a Play)

Costume Designer Kendra Rai was awarded a 2014 Princess Grace Foundation honorarium to be used for the company's 2014–2015 season costumes

== See also ==
- Helen Hayes Award
- List of theaters in Washington, D.C.
