= Washington Area Theatre Community Honors =

- Awarded for: Excellence in community theatre in the Washington, D.C. area
- Country: United States
- First award: 2000; 26 years ago
- Website: www.washingtontheater.org

The Washington Area Theatre Community Honors, better known as the WATCH Awards, are theater awards recognizing excellence in Community theater in the Washington, D.C. area since 2000.

During the COVID pandemic, the WATCH Awards were put on hold. They are set to return in 2022.

== History ==
Established in 2000 to honor people involved in local theaters throughout the D.C. area, the first award show was presented March 2, 2001. The creation of the WATCH Awards helped "increase the reputation of area community theater," according to Michael Toscano of The Washington Post.

== Awards categories ==
In each of the forty categories, five nominees were selected based on the average scores of eight judges. In some categories, due to score ties, more than five nominees are announced. Nominations are provided in alphabetical order by nominee. The nominations are provided by category and then by theater at the end of the document.

- Technical Achievements
  - Outstanding Set Design
  - Outstanding Set Construction
  - Outstanding Set Painting
  - Outstanding Set Decoration and Set Dressing
  - Outstanding Properties
  - Outstanding Lighting Design
  - Outstanding Sound Design
  - Outstanding Costume Design
  - Outstanding Makeup Design
  - Outstanding Hair Design
  - Outstanding Special Effects
- Performances by an Actor or Actress in a Play or Musical
  - Outstanding Cameo
  - Outstanding Featured Actress
  - Outstanding Featured Actor
  - Outstanding Lead Actress
  - Outstanding Lead Actor
- Outstanding Achievement in Overall Production
  - Outstanding Stage Combat Choreography
  - Outstanding Choreography
  - Outstanding Music Direction
  - Outstanding Direction of a Play or Musical
  - Outstanding Musical
  - Outstanding Play
- Special Awards
  - The Leta Hall Award – For Outstanding Ensemble Performance in a Play or Musical

== Winners and nominees ==
- 2000
- 2001
- 2002
- 2003
- 2004
- 2005
- 2006
- 2007
- 2008
- 2009
- 2010
- 2011
- 2012
- 2013
- 2014
- 2015
- 2016
- 2017
- 2018
- 2019

== See also ==
- Theater in Washington, DC
- Helen Hayes Award
- Gotham Awards
