= Source Theatre Company (Washington, D.C.) =

Theater company in Washington, D.C.

Coordinates: 38°54′54.7″N 77°1′54.2″W

Source Theatre Company (Washington D.C.)
- Source Theatre Company Logo in use at the time the company ceased production
- Formation: 1977
- Dissolved: 2002
- Type: Theatre group
- Purpose: New plays and reinterpretation of the classics
- Location: Washington, D.C.

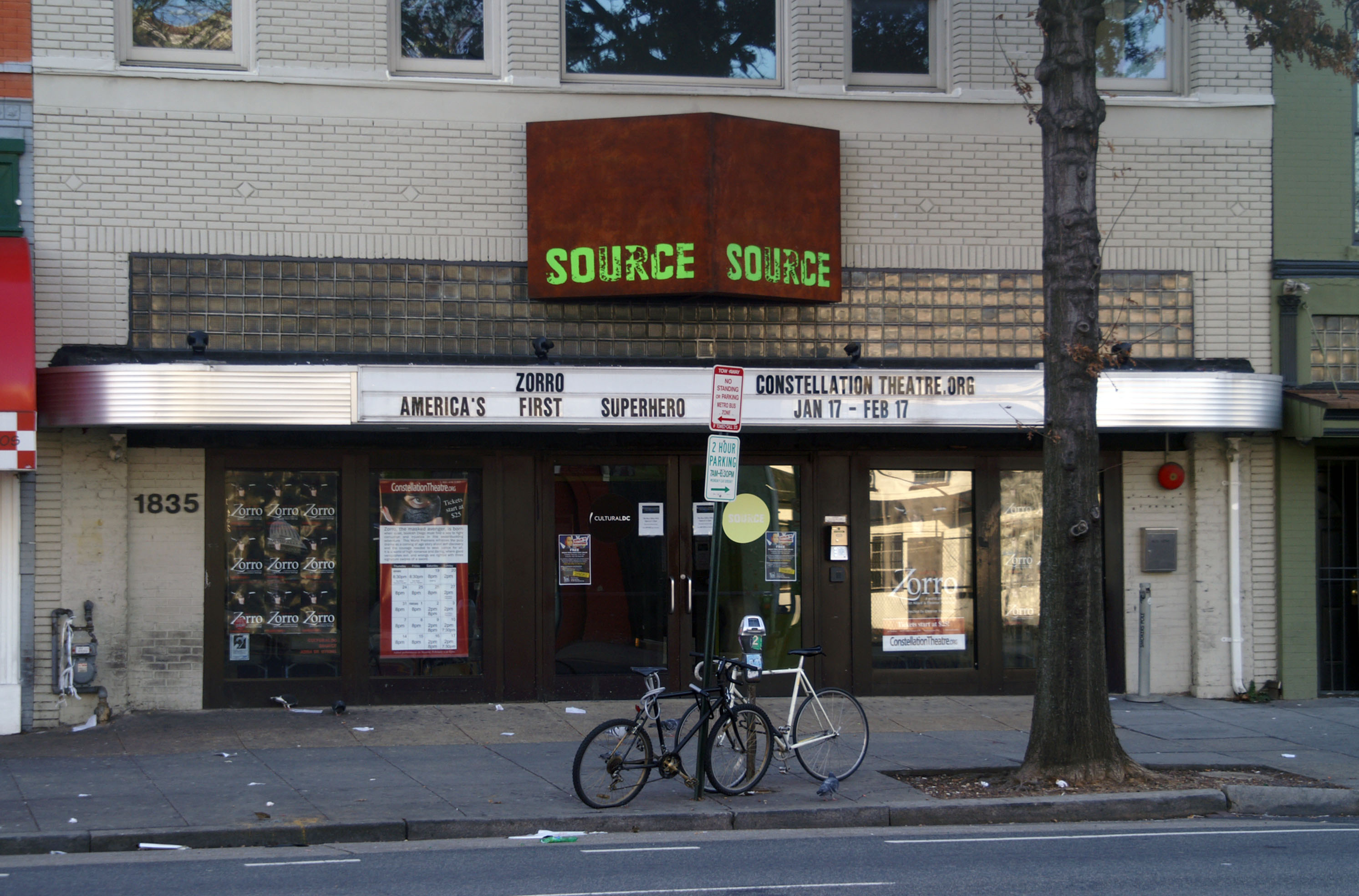
The Source Theater on 14th Street NW, Washington, D.C.

Source Theatre Company was a non-profit theater company founded by Bart Whiteman in Washington, D.C., that operated from 1977 until 2002 and formally disbanded in 2006.

Located at 1835 14th St NW in the 14th Street corridor, its theatre building had a 120-seat black box performance space with loading dock and dressing rooms. The second floor had a rehearsal room, conference room, and office space.

The company aimed to help emerging theater artists, by producing new plays, reinterpreting the classics, non-traditional casting, and performing in non-established performance space. It received six Helen Hayes Awards and was nominated for 44 more.

Since the company disbanded in 2006, its facility has been used by several theatrical organizations, including:

- Constellation Theatre Company
- Washington Improv Theater
- The In Series
