= Keegan Theatre =

Theatre building and theatre company in Washington, D.C.

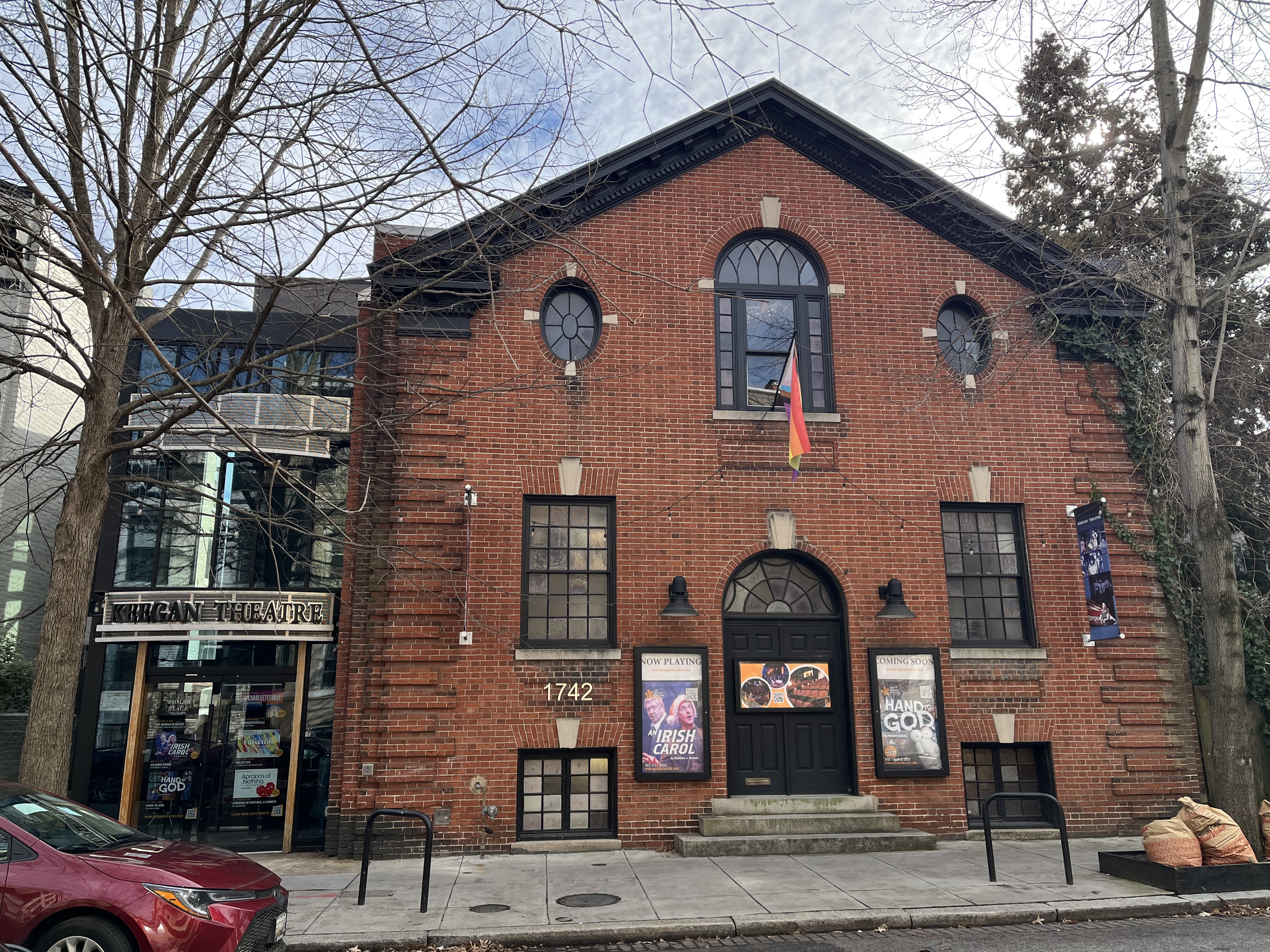
Keegan Theatre

The Keegan Theatre is an American professional theater based in Washington, D.C., that produces a mix of classics, musicals, and new works, including world premiere productions. It owns and operates a 120-seat theater in the Dupont Circle neighborhood, which it purchased and renovated in 2013. It is led by founding director Mark Rhea and artistic director Susan Marie Rhea. Megan Machnik is executive chair of the theater's board of directors.

Keegan has been described as "eclectic" and as one of Washington, D.C.'s "most popular small [theater] companies." From its early focus on Irish plays and playwrights, it has broadened its repertoire to include musicals and contemporary American and British works.

== Founding ==
Mark Rhea founded Keegan in 1996 along with co-founders Sheri Herren, Don Wright, and Eric Lucas. The inaugural production was Cat on a Hot Tin Roof in 1997. A Texan of Irish heritage, Mark Rhea has a special interest in Irish theater, plays and playwrights. His vision for Keegan was to take American classics to Ireland and perform Irish masterpieces in the United States. Keegan has conducted 15 theatrical tours of Ireland.

== Production history ==
The company has a tradition of producing plays by Irish and Irish-American playwrights. Its productions toured Ireland annually from 1999 to 2011 and again in 2014 and 2017. The theater's education arm, PLAY-RAH-KA, offers classes, camps, and theatrical experiences for children and families.

Annually since 2011, Keegan has produced An Irish Carol, a twist on the Charles Dickens A Christmas Carol set in an Irish pub. The play was written by Dublin native and Keegan company member Matthew J. Keenan.

Keegan is notable for producing contemporary Irish works, and produced the world premiere of Irish playwright Rosemary Jenkinson's Basra Boy in its 2010–11 season.

2017-18 season

- American Buffalo, by David Mamet, directed by Jon Townson, August/September 2017. (2017 Ireland tour)
- Stones in His Pockets, by Marie Jones, directed by Abigail Isaac Fine, September 23-October 15, 2017.
- Top Girls, by Caryl Churchill, directed by Amber Paige McGinnis, November 4-December 2, 2017.
- An Irish Carol, by Matthew J. Keenan, directed by Mark Rhea, December 14–31, 2017.
- Unnecessary Farce, by Paul Slade Smith, directed by Ray Ficca, January 19-February 10, 2018.
- Chicago, music by John Kander, lyrics by Fred Ebb, book by Fred Ebb and Bob Fosse, directed by Susan Marie Rhea and Mark Rhea, March 10-April 7, 2018.
- The Undeniable Sound of Right Now, by Laura Eason, directed by Brandon McCoy, May 5–27, 2018.
- Other Life Forms, by Brandon McCoy, directed by Shirley Serotsky, June 15-July 7, 2018.
- The Bridges of Madison County, book by Marsha Norman, music and lyrics by Jason Robert Brown, directed by Kurt Boehm, August 4-September 2, 2018.

2018-19 season

- Lincolnesque, by John Strand, directed by Colin Smith, September 2018.
- As You Like It, adapted by Shaina Taub and Laurie Woolery, music and lyrics by Shaina Taub, directed by Cara Gabriel and Josh Sticklin, November 2018.
- An Irish Carol, by Matthew J. Keenan, directed by Mark Rhea, December 2018.
- The Elves and the Shoemaker, by Kristin Walter, directed by Alexis J. Hartwick, December 2018. (A Keegan PLAY-RAH-KA production for families
- The Baltimore Waltz, by Paula Vogel, directed by Susan Marie Rhea, January 2019.
- Hands on a Hardbody, book by Doug Wright, music by Trey Anastasio and Amanda Green, lyrics by Amanda Green, directed by Mark Rhea, March 2019. (Regional premiere)
- God of Carnage, by Yasmina Reza, directed by Shirley Serotsky, May 2019.
- The Reluctant Dragon, by Mary Hall Surface, May 2019. (A Keegan PLAY-RAH-KA production for families)
- Ripcord, by David Lindsay-Abaire, directed by Megan Thrift, June 2019. (Regional premiere)
- Legally Blonde, music and lyrics by Laurence O'Keefe and Nell Benjamin, book by Heather Hach, directed by Michael J. Bobbitt, July 2019.

Ireland tour productions

- A Streetcar Named Desire, 1999
- Fool for Love, 2000
- Cat on a Hot Tin Roof, 2001
- The Glass Menagerie, 2002
- Who's Afraid of Virginia Woolf?, 2003
- True West, 2004
- A Streetcar Named Desire, 2005
- Death of a Salesman, 2006
- One Flew Over the Cuckoo's Nest, 2007
- Glengarry Glen Ross, 2008
- Of Mice and Men, 2009
- Fool for Love, October/November 2010
- The Crucible, October/November 2011
- A Few Good Men, August/September 2014
- American Buffalo, August/September 2017
