= Washington Improv Theater =

Improv comedy organization in Washington, D.C.

Coordinates: 38°54′54.7″N 77°1′54.2″W

- WIT's logo

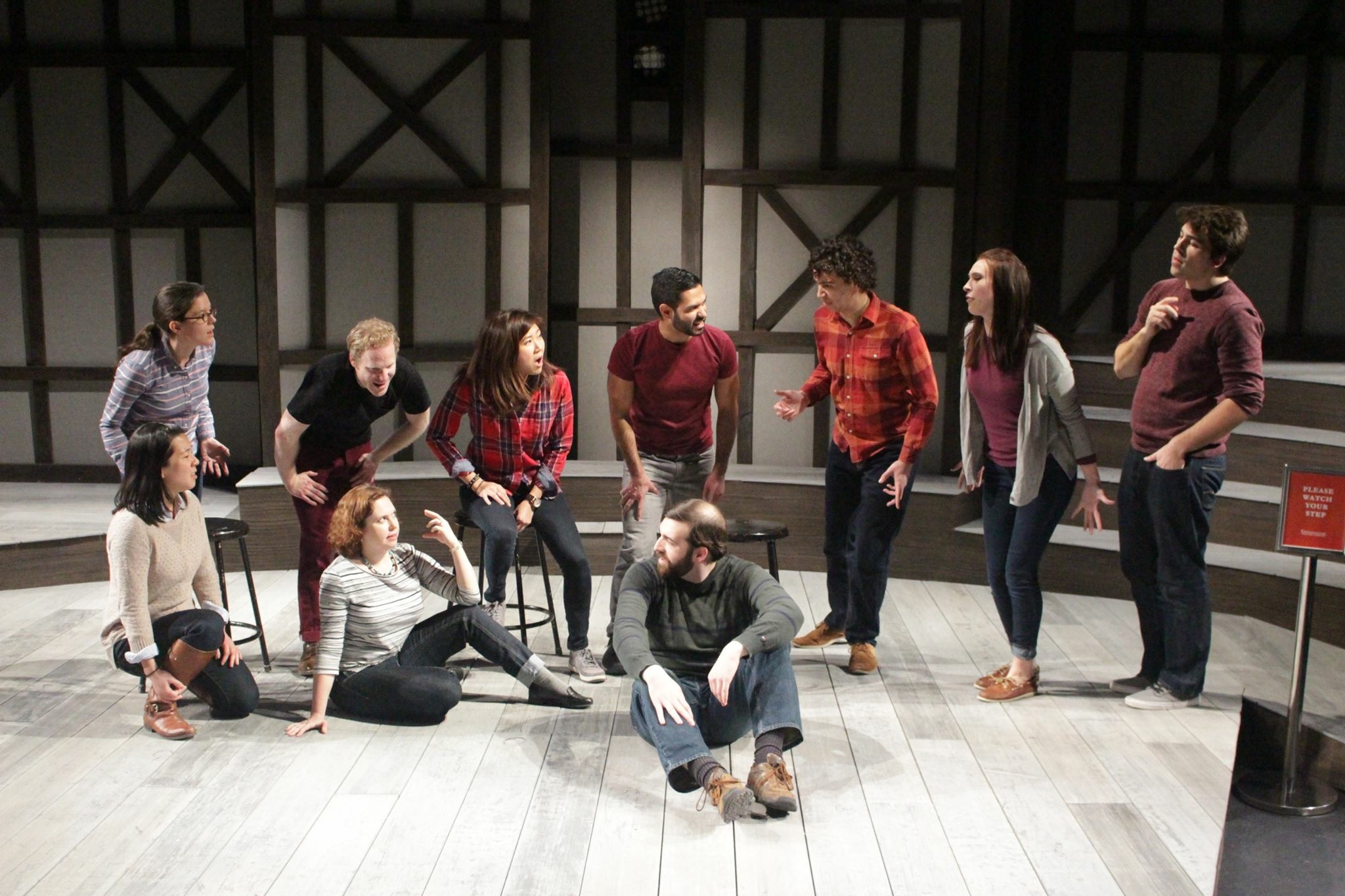
- WIT team "Wallawoo" performing at a Harold Night in 2016
- Formation: 1986
- Type: Theatre group
- Purpose: Improvisational comedy
- Location: 1835 14th St NW, Washington, D.C.
- Artistic director: Mark Chalfant
- Website: witdc.org

Washington Improv Theater (WIT) is an improvisational comedy theater company in Washington, D.C., specializing in long-form improv. It was founded in 1986 by Carole Douglis. Its shows are based at Studio Theatre on the 14th Street corridor, although its teams also use several other venues. Roughly 20,000 people attend WIT shows annually.

== History ==
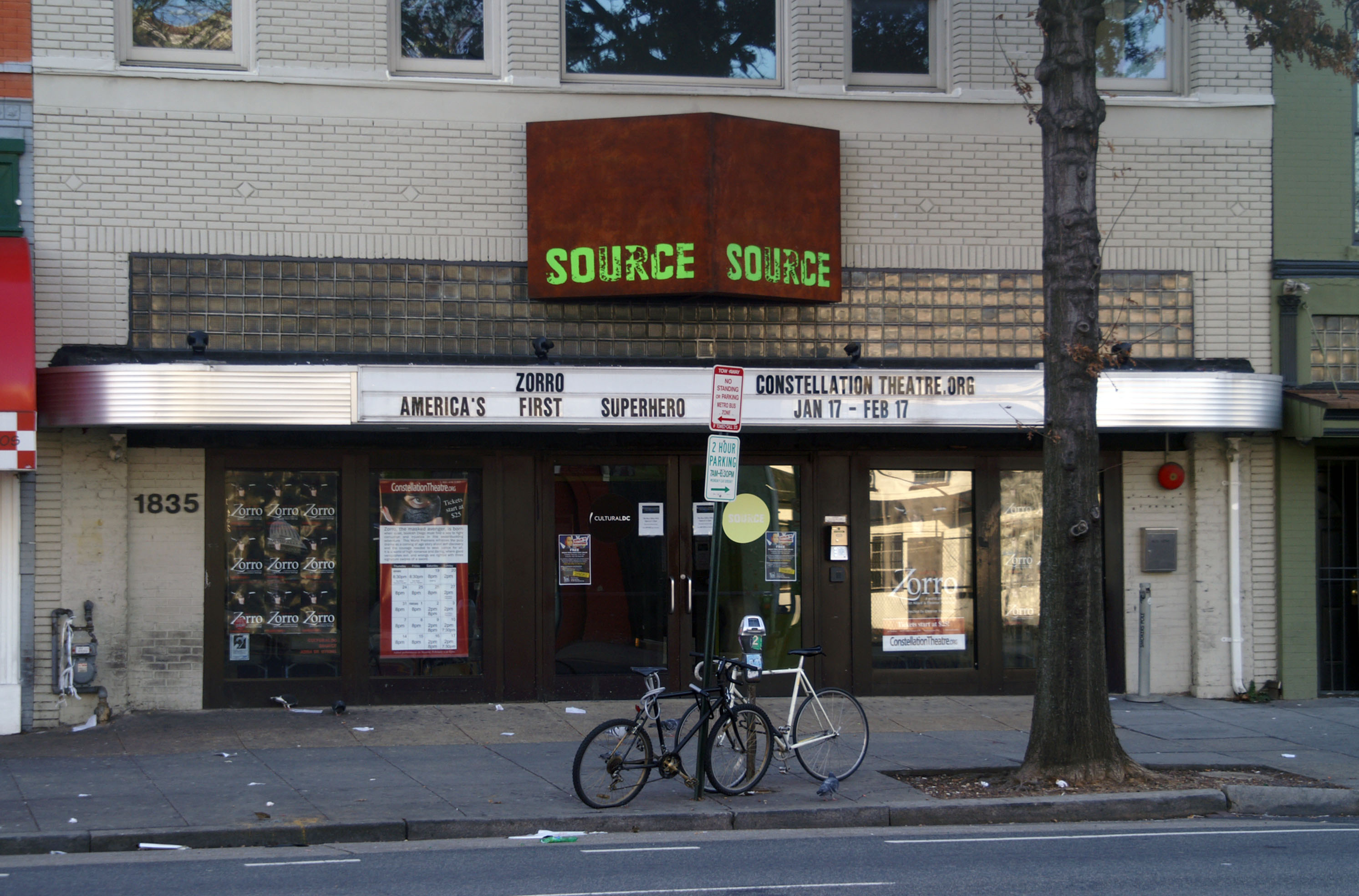
The Source Theater, WIT's former venue

WIT was founded in 1986 by Carole Douglis, but it went dormant in 1992. It was revived by Douglis and several others as a consensus-based collective in 1998, and performed initially in the basement of the Universalist National Memorial Church, and soon after other venues around D.C. It began offering its own improv training program in 2000. In 2004, it hired its first full-time artistic and executive director, Mark Chalfant. In 2008, it began performing at the 150-seat black box at Source Theater on 14th Street, the former venue of Source Theatre Company now operated by CultureDC. It continued expanding, and in FY2019 hosted 325 performances with an estimated 20,590 attendees. Since 2022, it has taken up residencies at Studio Theatre. It is currently building a dedicated space in NoMa slated to open in January 2027.

== Activities ==
WIT hosts over 300 performances annually featuring a number of different in-house ensembles and visiting teams. Its performances have received favorable reviews from critics. They vary in form — for instance, iMusical is an improvised musical.

WIT's Tuesday evening pay-what-you-can Harold Night performances, begun in April 2010, feature four teams each performing half-hour harold sets. WIT also hosts an annual improv marathon festival, Improvalooza, a March madness-style competition, dubbed the Fighting Improv Smackdown Tournament, and performances or lessons at various other venues, such as local schools and the Kennedy Center.

WIT's improv classes enrolled 1,728 students in FY2019 across a five-level curriculum.

WIT runs a program for corporate clients, "WIT at Work". In 2019, the program worked with 79 clients with a total of 2900 participants.

== Notable performers ==
- Natasha Rothwell
- Aparna Nancherla
