= Banished? productions =

banished? productions
- Formation: 2005
- Type: Theatre group
- Purpose: Avant-pop theatre
- Location: Washington, D.C.
- Artistic director: Carmen C. Wong
- Website: http://www.banishedproductions.org/

banished? productions is an avant-pop performance company based in Washington, D.C., that combines mass media with audience immersion in productions that play with text and form. The company's best selling performance piece was A Tactile Dinner.

== History ==
banished? productions was founded in 2005 by a group of artists in Washington, D.C. Led by Carmen C. Wong, their first production was a one-night staged reading of Adam de la Halle's Greenwood Follies & Other Old French Plays, funded with a grant from the DC Commission on the Arts and Humanities. With help from a grant by the Embassy of Spain in Washington, they were then able to stage their first full production, Desire Caught by the Tail, a surreal and rarely produced play by Pablo Picasso, as part of the inaugural Capital Fringe Festival in 2006.

Other critically acclaimed works include a production of Charles Mee's post-modern play bobrauschenbergamerica and a co-production premier of My Comic Valentine, a dramatization of 1950s romance comics. banished? productions has contributed art installations to local venues and has produced an original audio walk about DC's Columbia Heights and Mount Pleasant neighborhoods called Walk with Me.

== A Tactile Dinner ==
The company's best selling play A Tactile Dinner, debuted at the Capital Fringe Festival in 2009. This play was inspired by The Futurist Cookbook, written in 1932 by the founder of the Italian Futurism art movement Filippo Marinetti. Patrons were "exposed to a banquet of both the palate and the mind", Futurist meals that included "aerofood infused with irony, cast-selected dinner jackets, and an iconoclastic rant against the evils of pasta". In 2011 their Tactile Dinner Car combined Futurist gastronomy with the resurgence of urban food truck culture. In this "crazy sociological experiment playing by its own rules" that is "best enjoyed with an adventurous palate and a thorough appreciation for the ridiculous", the theatergoers and bystanders ordered surreal concoctions from a futurist food car reminiscent of designs by Buckminster Fuller

== Production history ==
- October 2005: Greenwood Follies and other Old French Plays
- July 2006: Desire Caught by the Tail, by Pablo Picasso
- July 2007: bobrauschenbergamerica, by Charles Mee
- October 2007: Ballade Mechanique 1.0 (story telling machine)
- July 2008: Hijos del Limbo (co-production with Las Jamonas)
- February 2009: My Comic Valentine (co-production with Rotogravure Entertainment)
- July 2009: A Tactile Dinner
- March 2010: t42 (performance installation at the [Embassy of Korea])
- March 2010: Aerofood + Plush World
- April 2010: Ballade Mechanique 2.0 (commissioned for the Marion Street Garden)
- May 2010: Tactile Dinner at Big Bear Cafe and Tactile Dinner at Long View Gallery
- July 2010: Handbook for Hosts (co-production with Happenstance Theater)
- December 2010: Walk with Me (an alternative audio walk)
- July 2011: Tactile Dinner Car
