= H Street Playhouse =

- Plymouth Theater
- U.S. National Register of Historic Places
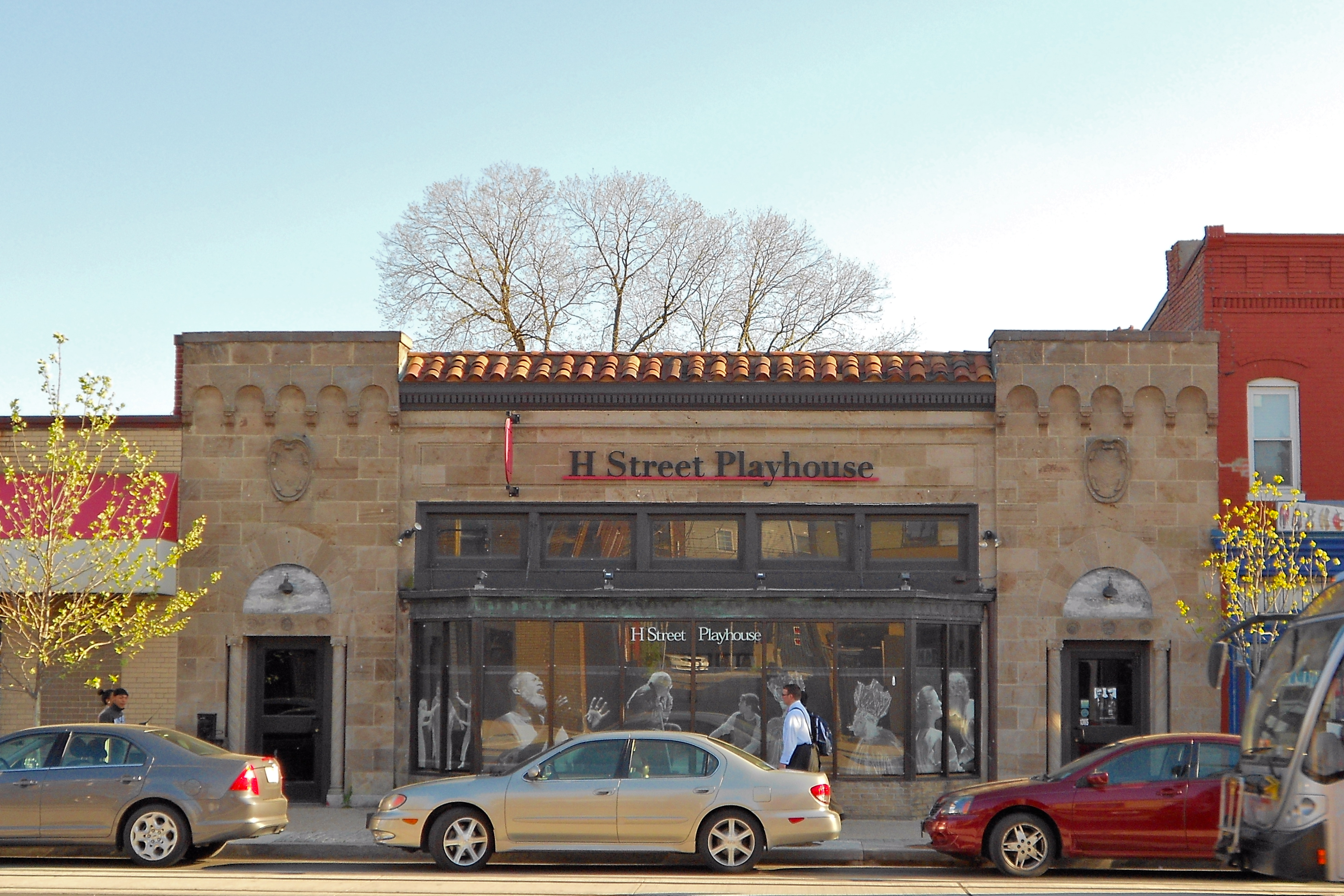

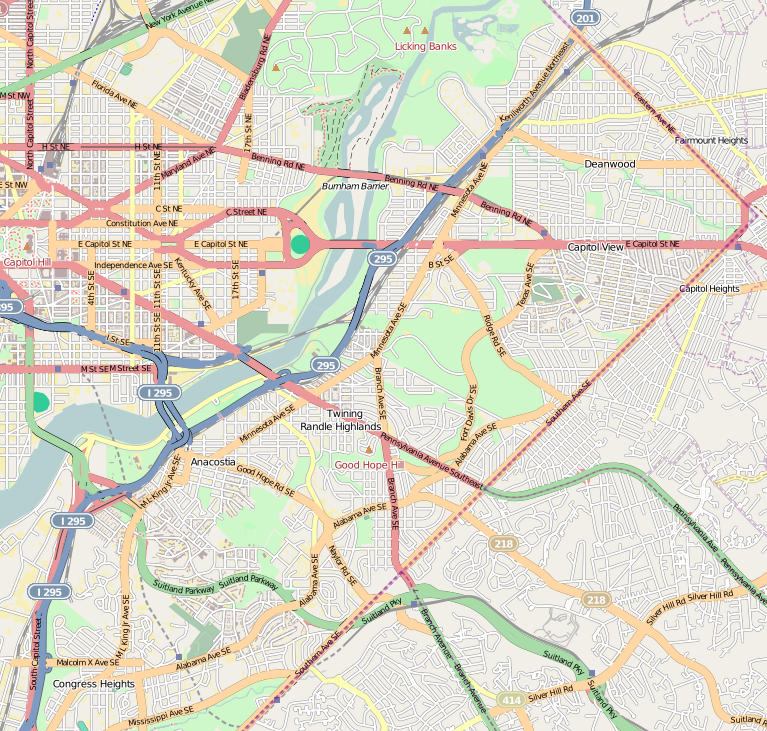
- Location within Washington, D.C. Location within the District of Columbia Location within the United States
- Location: 1365 H Street N.E., Washington, D.C.
- Coordinates: 38°54′7.43″N 76°59′11.23″W
- Built: 1928
- Architect: Upman and Adams
- Architectural style: Romanesque Revival
- NRHP reference No.: 04000117
- Added to NRHP: March 3, 2004

The H Street Playhouse was a black box theater and gallery located in the Atlas District of Washington, D.C. Home to resident companies Scena Theatre, Theater Alliance and Forum Theatre, the Playhouse also hosted African Continuum Theatre Company, Musefire, Landless Theater Company, Theater Blue, Journeymen Theater Company, Madcap Players, Solas Nua, Restoration Stage, Capitol Renaissance Theatre, and Barnstormers. After opening its doors in 2001, the H Street Playhouse, with Theater Alliance, was at the forefront of a movement to develop and revitalize the H Street commercial corridor. The H Street Playhouse closed in 2012.

== History ==
The building was built in 1928 by William Oshinsky and leased to businesses or was vacant during his ownership of the property from construction to 1959.

The building was originally occupied by Sam's Garage and Moller Motors according to the 1928 Business Directory. There is no evidence that the building was custom built for their intended use. Evidence and circumstance suggests that the building was built speculatively to capitalize on the demand for automobiles and the significant growth and flux of the automobile sales industry. In June 1928, the Hupmobile distributor in D.C. was listed as Mott Motors, Inc. with sales and service at 1507 14th St., NW and Union Station Garage at 50 H St., NE. An article headlined as ' NEW HUPMOBILE IS IN BIG DEMAND' in the Washington Herald on Sunday July 15, 1928, stated:

The continued record-breaking demand for the new Hupmobile Century models is giving us one of the hardest jobs we have had in years in keeping our stock cars in shape to make deliveries,

said TT Mott Washington, distributor.

Our business has been on a steady increase since the first of last fall. We have kept a steady stream of letters and telegrams between here and Detroit to try and impress on the factory officials the serious need for new cars in Washington and adjacent territory.

This situation as well as the pressure exerted by competing car companies and models, such as the new Plymouth 4 (model Q) introduced in July 1928, most probably encouraged Mott to expand to the 1300 block of H Street, NE.

In 1929 and 1930, the building at 1365 H St NE was occupied as a branch automobile showroom of Mott Motors, Inc., owned by Thomas T. Mott. The main showroom was located at 1512–1520 14th Street NW listed as a Hupmobile Dealership. Another Mott showroom was located at 1738 14th Street NW. This was a short-lived venture at 1365 H St NE that appears to have ceased in the early thirties. In 1930, Thomas T. Mott lived in Bethesda, Maryland. One other Hupmobile dealership located in Washington, D.C., was owned by Sterret and Fleming, located on Champlain Street at Kalorama Rd NW and 1223 Connecticut Avenue NW.

In 1931 the building was occupied by Nash RJ Motor Co. In 1932 and 33, Nash Rohr Barsky, Inc. was listed as the occupant of 1365 H Street. In 1934 it was occupied by Kingston-Otey Motors. The building was occupied by Duke & Otey Motors, Inc. from 1935 to 1939. From 1940 to 1942, Duke & Cooksey were listed as occupants of the building.

By 1943 the property began a period of volatility and adaptive reuses. This period lasted from 1943 until the Oshinskys sold the building in 1959. At various times in this period, the building was vacant.

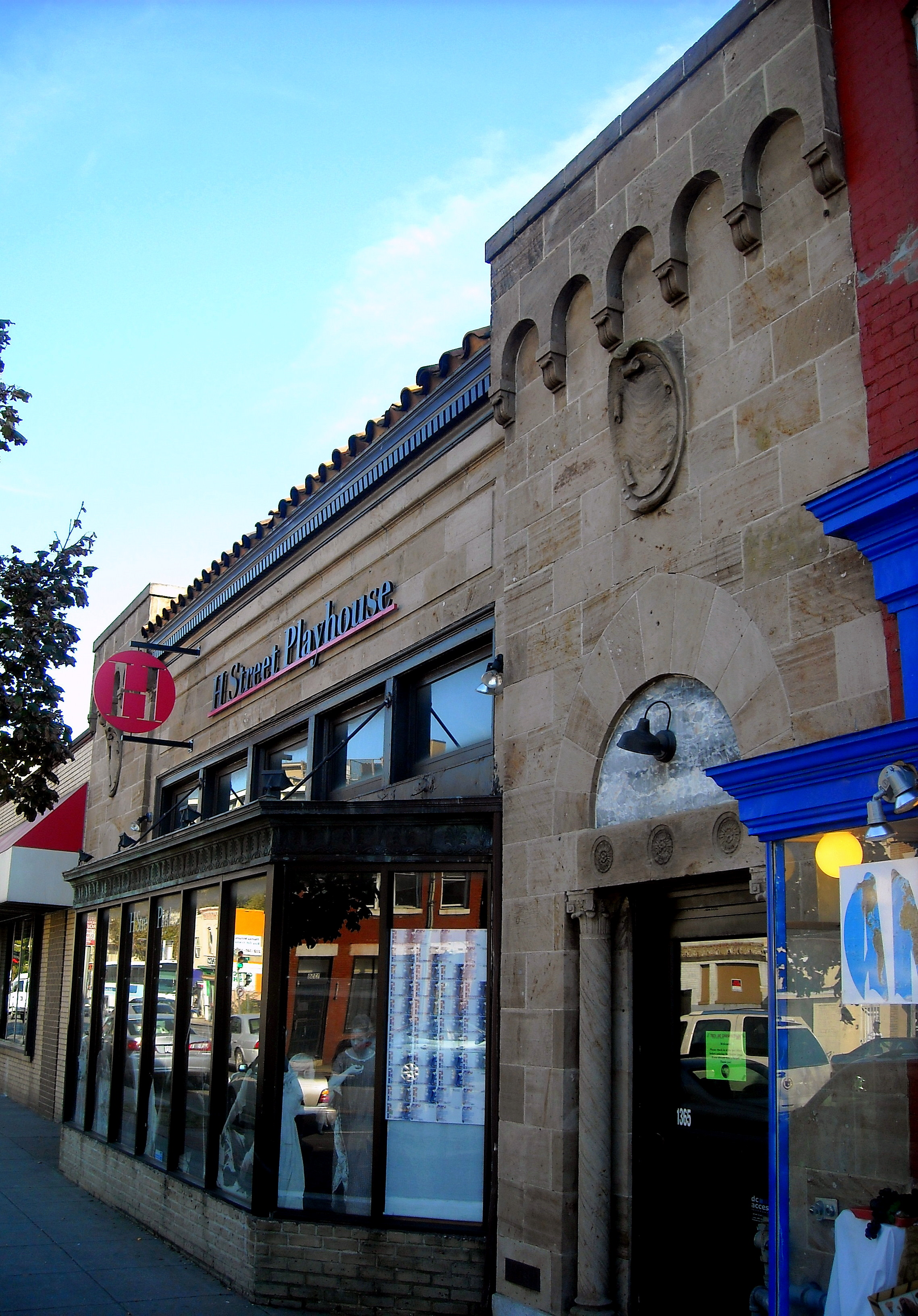
H Street Playhouse

The Plymouth Theatre motion picture theater was created as a neighborhood theater for Black people with its grand opening in 1943. Morris Hallett was the architect for this adaptive reuse that took the former Plymouth car salesroom and converted it into a 400-seat (300-seat by some accounts) movie theater. The remodeling cost $3,500. In 1945, Ike Weiner took it over until it closed in 1952. The property was listed by the City Directory as vacant in 1954 and was likely vacant from the time the theater closed in 1952 until 1955.

King Furniture Company was located at 8203 Georgia Avenue in Silver Spring, Maryland. In 1955 they expanded to include 1365 H Street as one of their furniture stores. This lasted until 1957, when both King Furniture and the Jet Arena were listed in the telephone directory of that year.

Roller Rink Jet Arena was listed in the telephone directory in one edition of the 1957 telephone directory under skating rinks.

King Furniture in the white pages of the telephone directory published in September, 1958, 1365 H Street is listed as the only location for King Furniture.

According to Congressional Title, in 1959 the building was sold by the Oshinskys to Clements Printing, a long-standing business in the 1300 block of H Street and occupied this building from 1959 until 1984.

French's Restaurant was operated by John French, former Vice President with McDonald's Corporation, who purchased the property from Clements Printing in 1984 and completed a renovation to open a southern soul food restaurant. This restaurant operated until the end of 2001 upon sale of the building to Adele and Bruce Robey. The Robeys, publishers of the local newspaper, Voice of the Hill and proprietors of Phoenix Graphics, purchased the building with the sole purpose of converting the building to a live theater venue.

== See also ==
- Hupmobile Dealership (Omaha, Nebraska)
- National Register of Historic Places listings in the District of Columbia
- Theater in Washington D.C.
