= Cultural Alliance of Greater Washington =

The Cultural Alliance of Greater Washington (CAGW) works to increase appreciation, support, and resources for arts and culture in the Greater Washington, D.C. region with over 300 member organizations.
