= Helen Hayes Award =

Theater awards in the Washington D.C. area, named in tribute of actress Helen Hayes

- Awarded for: Excellence in professional theatre in the Washington, D.C. area
- Country: United States
- Presented by: theatreWashington
- First award: 1983; 43 years ago
- Website: theatrewashington.org/helenhayesawards

The Helen Hayes Awards are theater awards recognizing excellence in professional theater in the Washington, D.C. area since 1983. The awards are named in tribute of Helen Hayes, who is also known as the "First Lady of American Theatre." They are presented by Theatre Washington (formerly known as the Helen Hayes Awards organization), sponsored by TodayTix, a ticketing company, and supported in part by the DC Commission on the Arts and Humanities, The Morris and Gwendolyn Cafritz Foundation, The Max and Victoria Dreyfus Foundation, The Share Fund, Prince Charitable Trust, and Craig Pascal and Victor Shargai.

== History ==
In 1983, together with producing partner Arthur Cantor and Washington Post critic emeritus Richard L. Coe, Broadway producer Bonnie Nelson Schwartz presented a plan for strengthening and cultivating theatre in her home city, Washington, D.C., to the first lady of the American theatre and native Washingtonian, Helen Hayes, who embraced the idea. The Washington Theatre Awards Society was founded to recognize and encourage excellence in professional theatre in the Washington region through the presentation of the Helen Hayes Awards.

The organization launched education and communication programs. The early success of the Helen Hayes Awards suggested that the organization do business under the name of its most visible program. Eventually, at the input of the theatre community and a wide range of stakeholders, the organization aimed to become more robust, and adopted the name "theatreWashington" to better reflect the breadth and geographic scope of its realigned activities. In 2021 it changed its name to Theatre Washington.

Due to criticism of the "one size fits all" philosophy of the awards, in September 2013 theatreWashington announced that, effective with the 2015 awards, the awards would be split into

1. The Helen Group of Awards for non-Equity productions defined to be those that have no more than three equity actors or the equity actors make up less than 51% of the cast.
2. The Hayes Group of Awards for productions employing too many Equity actors to qualify for the Helen Group.

These awards would be at the production level, not at the company level.

== Awards categories ==
With 183 theaters in the larger Washington metropolitan area, the city is second only to New York for the number of productions each year. The awards for acting, directing, design, choreography, productions, and more include:

- Helen Categories
  - Outstanding Play
  - Outstanding Director of a Play
  - Outstanding Lead Performer in a Play
  - Outstanding Supporting Performer in a Play
  - Outstanding Ensemble in a Play
  - Outstanding Choreography in a Play
  - Outstanding Musical
  - Outstanding Director of a Musical
  - Outstanding Lead Performer in a Musical
  - Outstanding Supporting Performer in a Musical
  - Outstanding Ensemble in a Musical
  - Outstanding Choreography in a Musical
  - Outstanding Musical Direction
  - Outstanding Costume Design
  - Outstanding Lighting Design
  - Outstanding Set Design
  - Outstanding Sound Design
  - Outstanding Media/Projection Design
- Hayes Categories
  - Outstanding Play
  - Outstanding Director of a Play
  - Outstanding Lead Performer in a Play
  - Outstanding Supporting Performer in a Play
  - Outstanding Ensemble in a Play
  - Outstanding Choreography in a Play
  - Outstanding Musical
  - Outstanding Director of a Musical
  - Outstanding Lead Performer in a Musical
  - Outstanding Supporting Performer in a Musical
  - Outstanding Ensemble in a Musical
  - Outstanding Choreography in a Musical
  - Outstanding Musical Direction
  - Outstanding Costume Design
  - Outstanding Lighting Design
  - Outstanding Set Design
  - Outstanding Sound Design
  - Outstanding Media/Projection Design
- Additional Categories
  - Outstanding Visiting Production
  - Outstanding Performer, Visiting Production
  - Outstanding Production, Theatre for Young Audiences
  - The Charles MacArthur Award for Outstanding Original New Play or Musical
  - Outstanding Original Play or Musical Adaptation
  - The John Aniello Award for Outstanding Emerging Theatre
  - The Helen Hayes Tribute

== Nominee and recipient selection ==
- 40 judges across five panels, specifically endorsed for the purpose by a panel of Washington-area artistic directors, are dispatched to see each eligible production.
- Each judge evaluates each artist's work in the production on a 0–10 graded point scale in each of applicable categories. Ballots must be submitted within 24 hours of the judge's attendance.
- Judges have no idea as to the Awards status of any work they have seen and scored until the public does, i.e., when the nominees (and then the recipients) are announced.
- At the conclusion of the 12-month judging cycle (January–December), the scores from the eight judges who saw each production are tabulated by an independent analysis firm.
- In all, about 22,000 scores are analyzed annually, using standardized and widely accepted statistical models.
- The productions, designs, and performances receiving the top-five final scores in each category become the nominees. In the case of tie votes, a tie-breaking system is used, and if the tie still cannot be broken, the number of nominees is simply increased.
- Following the public announcement of the nominees, the process continues to determine the award recipient in each category. Again, in the case of tie votes, a tie-breaking system is used, and if the tie still cannot be broken, the number of recipients is increased.

== See also ==
- Theater in Washington, DC
