= National Register of Historic Places listings in Northeast Quadrant, Washington, D.C. =

This is a list of properties and districts in the Northeast quadrant of Washington, D.C. that are listed on the National Register of Historic Places.

This National Park Service list is complete through NPS recent listings posted August 21, 2026.

== Current listings ==
	Name on the Register	Image	Date listed	Location	City or town	Description
1	American Revolution Statuary	American Revolution Statuary	July 14, 1978 (#78000256)	Public buildings and various parks within DC; 38°53′37″N 76°59′59″W	Stanton Park	14 statues including 11 in central DC, and the General Nathanael Greene statue in Stanton Park
2	Atlas Theater and Shops	Atlas Theater and Shops	November 10, 2010 (#10000909)	1313-33 H Street, NE; 38°53′59″N 76°59′15″W	Near Northeast	
3	Mountjoy Bayly House	Mountjoy Bayly House	July 20, 1973 (#73002072)	122 Maryland Ave., NE; 38°53′29″N 77°00′18″W	Capitol Hill	
4	Brookland Bowling Alleys	Brookland Bowling Alleys	August 19, 2019 (#100004306)	3726 10th St. NE. 38°56′10″N 76°59′36″W	Brookland	
5	Brooks Mansion	Brooks Mansion	July 17, 1975 (#75002045)	901 Newton St., NE. 38°55′58″N 76°59′37″W	Brookland	
6	Ralph Bunche House	Ralph Bunche House	September 30, 1993 (#93001013)	1510 Jackson St., NE. 38°55′47″N 76°59′02″W	Brookland	
7	Bunker Hill Elementary School	Bunker Hill Elementary School	May 5, 2014 (#14000186)	1401 Michigan Ave., NE; 38°56′31″N 76°59′06″W	Brookland	
8	Capitol Hill Historic District	Capitol Hill Historic District	August 27, 1976 (#76002127)	Roughly bounded by Virginia Ave., SE., S. Capitol St., F St., NE., and 14th Sts., SE. and NE.; also roughly bounded by 7th St., NE., I-295, M St., SE., and 11th St., SE. 38°53′13″N 76°59′51″W	NE, SE and NW	Second set of boundaries represents a boundary increase of July 3, 2003
9	Chesapeake and Potomac Telephone Company Warehouse and Repair Facility	Chesapeake and Potomac Telephone Company Warehouse and Repair Facility	May 14, 2007 (#06001159)	1111 N. Capitol St. NE; 38°54′15″N 77°00′32″W	NE	
10	Children's Country Home	Children's Country Home	December 9, 2003 (#03001254)	1731 Bunker Hill Rd. NE; 38°56′29″N 76°58′39″W	Woodridge	
11	Civil War Fort Sites	Civil War Fort Sites	July 15, 1974 (#74000274)	Arc of sites surrounding central Washington in Maryland, Virginia, and D.C. 38°56′08″N 76°59′15″W	All quadrants	At the outset of the Civil War in 1861, Washington became a critical target for rebel attacks but was virtually without protection. The Union Army hastily began construction of a fortified defense line around the city, the physical remnants of which encompass these 19 earthwork forts, including Fort Totten, Fort Bunker Hill, Fort Lincoln, and Fort Mahan. See also National Register listings in central D.C., western NW D.C., upper NW D.C., SE D.C., Prince George's County, Maryland, and Fairfax County, Virginia.
12	Civil War Monuments in Washington, DC	Civil War Monuments in Washington, DC	September 20, 1978 (#78000257)	Various parks within the original boundaries of city 38°53′23″N 76°59′25″W	Various	18 statues about people and topics related to the Civil War, including 1 in Lincoln Park (NE & SE quadrants), 6 in the upper NW quadrant, and 11 in central Washington.
13	Alexander Crummell School	Alexander Crummell School	July 25, 2003 (#03000671)	Kendall and Gallaudet Sts, NE; 38°54′48″N 76°59′07″W	NE	
14	Dahlgreen Courts	Dahlgreen Courts	November 10, 2010 (#10000901)	2504-2520 10th St., NE; 38°55′22″N 76°59′34″W	Brookland	Apartment Buildings in Washington, DC, MPS
15	East Capitol Street Carbarn	East Capitol Street Carbarn	February 5, 1974 (#74002158)	1400 E. Capitol St., NE. 38°53′23″N 76°59′06″W	NE	
16	East Corner Boundary Marker of the Original District of Columbia	East Corner Boundary Marker of the Original District of Columbia	November 1, 1996 (#96001249)	100 ft. E of jct. of Eastern and Southern Aves. 38°53′35″N 76°54′34″W	NE and SE	See List of Boundary Markers of the Original District of Columbia
17	Eastern High School	Eastern High School	October 30, 2023 (#100009489)	1730 East Capitol Street NE; 38°53′48″N 76°59′13″W	NE	
18	Emerald Street Historic District	Emerald Street Historic District	September 5, 2017 (#100001560)	1307-1377, 1306-1368 Emerald St. NE., 517-519 13t St. NE., 518-520 14th St. NE. 38°53′48″N 76°59′13″W	NE	
19	Engine House No. 10	Engine House No. 10	November 19, 2008 (#08001063)	1341 Maryland Ave., NE; 38°53′54″N 76°59′13″W	NE	
20	Engine Company 17	Engine Company 17	June 6, 2007 (#07000538)	1227 Monroe St. NE; 38°55′56″N 76°59′24″W	Brookland	
21	Engine Company 26	Engine Company 26	May 18, 2011 (#11000283)	1340 Rhode Island Ave., NE; 38°55′29″N 76°59′12″W	Brentwood/ Brookland	Firehouses in Washington DC MPS
22	Engine Company 26, (Old)	Engine Company 26, (Old)	August 8, 2007 (#07000536)	2715 22nd St. NE; 38°55′30″N 76°58′27″W	NE	
23	Engine Company 27	Engine Company 27	May 18, 2011 (#11000284)	4201 Minnesota Ave., NE; 38°54′04″N 76°56′36″W	NE	Firehouses in Washington DC MPS
24	First Baptist Church of Deanwood	First Baptist Church of Deanwood	July 24, 2008 (#08000720)	1008 45th St. NE; 38°54′11″N 76°56′17″W	Deanwood	
25	Franciscan Monastery and Memorial Church of the Holy Land	Franciscan Monastery and Memorial Church of the Holy Land	January 17, 1992 (#91001943)	1400 Quincy St., NE. 38°56′13″N 76°59′00″W	Brookland	
26	Gallaudet College Historic District	Gallaudet College Historic District	October 15, 1966 (#66000856)	Florida Ave. and 7th St., NE. 38°54′22″N 76°59′45″W	NE	
27	Glenwood Cemetery	Glenwood Cemetery	January 17, 2017 (#16000638)	2219 Lincoln Rd., NE; 38°55′18″N 77°00′20″W	NE	
28	Glenwood Cemetery Mortuary Chapel	Glenwood Cemetery Mortuary Chapel	January 9, 1989 (#88003064)	2219 Lincoln Rd., NE; 38°55′19″N 77°00′22″W	NE	
29	Harewood Lodge	Harewood Lodge	May 20, 2019 (#100003672)	3600 Harewood Rd. NE. 38°55′57″N 77°00′05″W	NE	
30	Hecht Company Warehouse	Hecht Company Warehouse	May 25, 1994 (#94000446)	1401 New York Ave., NE. 38°54′52″N 76°59′06″W	NE	
31	Holy Name College (and James Sherwood Farmhouse)	Holy Name College (and James Sherwood Farmhouse)	January 8, 2026 (#100012519)	1400 Shepherd Street NE; 38°56′23″N 76°59′01″W	NE	
32	Holy Redeemer College	Holy Redeemer College	May 17, 2019 (#100003958)	3112 Seventh St. NE; 38°55′44″N 76°59′48″W	NE	
33	Kenilworth Aquatic Gardens	Kenilworth Aquatic Gardens	August 25, 1978 (#78000258)	Kenilworth Ave. and Douglas St. NE; 38°54′46″N 76°56′37″W	NE	
34	Kingman Park Historic District	Kingman Park Historic District	December 17, 2018 (#100002960)	Between Rosedale & D St., Maryland Ave. NE, 19th St. & Oklahoma Ave. NE; also 900-2000 blks. of C, D and E Sts. NE; 300 and 400 blks. of 19th and 20th Sts. NE; 38°53′44″N 76°58′28″W	Kingman Park	Second set of addresses represent a boundary increase approved April 22, 2021.
35	Langston Golf Course Historic District	Langston Golf Course Historic District	October 15, 1991 (#91001525)	Roughly, Anacostia Park N of Benning Rd. NE; 38°54′08″N 76°57′54″W	NE	
36	Langston Terrace Dwellings	Langston Terrace Dwellings	November 12, 1987 (#87001851)	N from Benning Rd. to H St., NE; 38°53′58″N 76°58′26″W	Langston	
37	The Lexington	The Lexington	January 19, 2016 (#15000978)	1114 F St., NE; 38°53′51″N 76°59′28″W	Near Northeast	
38	Marist College	Marist College	September 22, 2025 (#100012260)	405 Fort Slemmer Drive NE (3875 Harewood Road NE); 38°56′20″N 77°00′01″W		On the campus of Catholic University of America
39	Mayfair Mansions Apartments	Mayfair Mansions Apartments	November 1, 1989 (#89001735)	3819 Jay St., NE; 38°54′11″N 76°56′55″W	Mayfair	
40	Metropolitan Apartments	Metropolitan Apartments	May 12, 2014 (#14000199)	200-210 Rhode Island Ave., NE. 38°55′09″N 77°00′12″W	Edgewood	
41	Newton Theater	Newton Theater	June 27, 2007 (#07000592)	3601-3611 12th St. NE; 38°56′08″N 76°59′27″W	Brookland	
42	Northeast No. 3 Boundary Marker of the Original District of Columbia	Northeast No. 3 Boundary Marker of the Original District of Columbia	November 1, 1996 (#96001256)	144 ft. NW of jct. of Eastern Ave. and Chillum Rd. 38°57′55″N 77°00′06″W	NE	
43	Northeast No. 4 Boundary Marker of the Original District of Columbia	Northeast No. 4 Boundary Marker of the Original District of Columbia	November 1, 1996 (#96001255)	5400 Sargent Rd. 38°57′17″N 76°59′17″W	NE	
44	Northeast No. 5 Boundary Marker of the Original District of Columbia	Northeast No. 5 Boundary Marker of the Original District of Columbia	November 1, 1996 (#96001254)	4609 Eastern Ave. 38°56′39″N 76°58′28″W	NE	
45	Northeast No. 6 Boundary Marker of the Original District of Columbia	Northeast No. 6 Boundary Marker of the Original District of Columbia	November 1, 1996 (#96001253)	3601 Eastern Ave. 38°56′01″N 76°57′41″W	NE	
46	Northeast No. 7 Boundary Marker of the Original District of Columbia	Northeast No. 7 Boundary Marker of the Original District of Columbia	November 1, 1996 (#96001252)	Ft. Lincoln Cemetery; 38°55′26″N 76°56′56″W	NE	
47	Northeast No. 8 Boundary Marker of the Original District of Columbia	Northeast No. 8 Boundary Marker of the Original District of Columbia	November 1, 1996 (#96001251)	Kenilworth Aquatics Gardens, NW of jct. of Eastern and Kenilworth Aves. 38°54′50″N 76°56′10″W	NE	
48	Northeast No. 9 Boundary Marker of the Original District of Columbia	Northeast No. 9 Boundary Marker of the Original District of Columbia	November 1, 1996 (#96001250)	919 Eastern Ave. 38°54′12″N 76°55′21″W	NE	
49	Northeast Savings Bank	Northeast Savings Bank	December 28, 2023 (#100009657)	800 H Street, NE; 38°54′01″N 76°59′41″W	NE	
50	Plymouth Theater	Plymouth Theater	March 3, 2004 (#04000117)	1365 H St., NE; 38°54′07″N 76°59′11″W	NE	
51	President's House, Gallaudet College	President's House, Gallaudet College	February 15, 1974 (#74002172)	7th St. and Florida Ave., NE. 38°54′19″N 76°59′46″W	NE	
52	Roosevelt Apartment Building	Roosevelt Apartment Building	September 7, 1994 (#94001045)	1116-1118 F St., NE. 38°53′50″N 76°59′27″W	Near Northeast	
53	St. Joseph's Seminary	St. Joseph's Seminary	September 28, 2022 (#100008232)	1200 Varnum St. NE. 38°56′37″N 76°59′21″W	NE	
54	St. Paul's College	St. Paul's College	September 13, 2018 (#100002913)	3015 4th St. NE. 38°55′41″N 76°59′56″W	NE	
55	Schlitz Brewing Company Washington Branch and National Geographic Society Warehouse	Schlitz Brewing Company Washington Branch and National Geographic Society Warehouse	January 3, 2023 (#100008512)	326 R St. NE. 38°54′46″N 77°00′06″W	Eckington	
56	Sewall–Belmont House National Historic Site	Sewall–Belmont House National Historic Site	June 16, 1972 (#72001432)	144 Constitution Ave., NE. 38°53′32″N 77°00′14″W	NE	
57	Slowe-Burrill House	Slowe-Burrill House	October 5, 2020 (#100005324)	1256 Kearny St. NE. 38°55′51″N 76°59′20″W	Brookland	Designated a National Historic Landmark December 13, 2024
58	Lucy Diggs Slowe Elementary School	Lucy Diggs Slowe Elementary School	December 20, 2021 (#100007259)	3115 14th St. NE and 1404 Jackson St. NE. 38°55′45″N 76°59′10″W		
59	Smothers Elementary School	Smothers Elementary School	June 23, 2023 (#100009057)	4400 Brooks St. NE; 38°53′37″N 76°56′18″W		
60	Spingarn Senior High School	Spingarn Senior High School	May 12, 2014 (#14000198)	2500 Benning Rd., NE. 38°53′58″N 76°58′15″W	Carver Langston	
61	Strand Theater	Strand Theater	November 25, 2008 (#08001093)	5129-5131 Nannie Helen Burroughs Ave., NE; 38°53′54″N 76°55′34″W	NE	
62	Trades Hall of National Training School for Women and Girls	Trades Hall of National Training School for Women and Girls	July 17, 1991 (#91002049)	601 50th St., NE. 38°53′46″N 76°55′48″W	NE	
63	Truck House No. 13	Truck House No. 13	June 6, 2007 (#07000535)	1342 Florida Ave. NE; 38°54′05″N 76°59′13″W	NE	
64	U.S. National Arboretum	U.S. National Arboretum	April 11, 1973 (#73002122)	24th and R Sts., NE. 38°54′42″N 76°57′58″W	NE	
65	U.S. Post Office Department Mail Equipment Shops	U.S. Post Office Department Mail Equipment Shops	July 11, 2016 (#16000435)	2135 5th St., NE; 38°55′08″N 76°59′58″W	Eckington	
66	Uline Ice Company Plant and Arena Complex	Uline Ice Company Plant and Arena Complex	May 17, 2007 (#07000448)	1132, 1140, and 1146 3rd St. NE; 38°54′18″N 77°00′11″W	Near Northeast	
67	Union Market Historic District	Union Market Historic District	January 31, 2017 (#100000596)	Between 4th and 5th Sts. NE., and Florida Ave. and Penn St., NE. 38°54′30″N 76°59′57″W	NE	
68	Union Station	Union Station	March 24, 1969 (#69000302)	Intersection of Massachusetts and Louisiana Aves. and 1st St., NE. 38°53′51″N 77°00′23″W	NE	
69	Union Station Plaza and Columbus Fountain	Union Station Plaza and Columbus Fountain	April 9, 1980 (#80004523)	1st St., Massachusetts and Louisiana Aves., NE; 38°53′47″N 77°00′23″W	NE	
70	United Brick Corporation Brick Complex	United Brick Corporation Brick Complex	October 3, 1978 (#78003061)	2801 New York Ave., NE. 38°54′58″N 76°58′06″W	NE	
71	Woodward & Lothrop Service Warehouse	Woodward & Lothrop Service Warehouse	February 15, 2005 (#05000046)	131 M St. NE; 38°54′25″N 77°00′17″W	Near Northeast	
72	Young, Browne, Phelps and Spingarn Educational Campus Historic District	Young, Browne, Phelps and Spingarn Educational Campus Historic District	May 3, 2016 (#15000743)	2500 Benning Rd., NE., 704, 820, & 850 26th St., NE; 38°54′00″N 76°58′15″W	NE	
