= Engine Company 26 (Washington, D.C.) =

- U.S. National Register of Historic Places
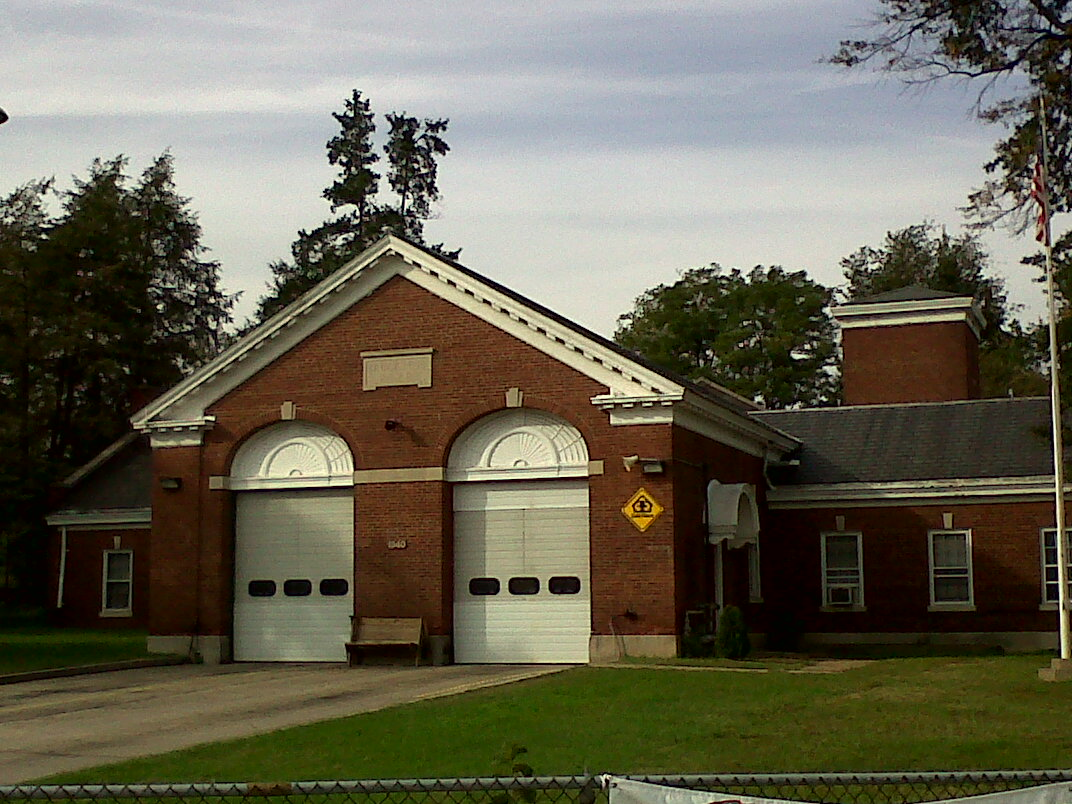
- Engine Company 26 (2011)

- Location within District of Columbia
- Location: 1340 Rhode Island Ave., NE, Washington, District of Columbia
- Coordinates: 38°55′29″N 76°59′12″W
- Area: less than one acre
- Built: 1937
- MPS: Firehouses in Washington DC MPS
- NRHP reference No.: 11000283
- Added to NRHP: May 18, 2011

Engine Company 26 in the Northeast quadrant of Washington, D.C., USA, is a historic firehouse located at 1340 Rhode Island Avenue on the border between Brentwood and Brookland. The building was listed by the National Register of Historic Places in May, 2011. The same Engine Company was located at 2715 22nd St. until 1940, and that building is also listed by the NRHP, as Old Engine Company 26 (Washington, D.C.). Both buildings were listed as part of the "Firehouses in Washington DC" Multiple Property Submission.

The new building was put into service on April 27, 1937, as the home of Truck Company 15. Its address was originally listed as 1340 Brentwood Road NE, but later changed to 1340 Rhode Island Ave., NE. The original equipment was a 1919 American LaFrance 85' aerial ladder truck, which was soon replaced with a 1923 American LaFrance 75' aerial ladder truck. Engine Company 26 made the short move to the new building in 1940.
