= Brookland Bowling Alleys =

- U.S. National Register of Historic Places
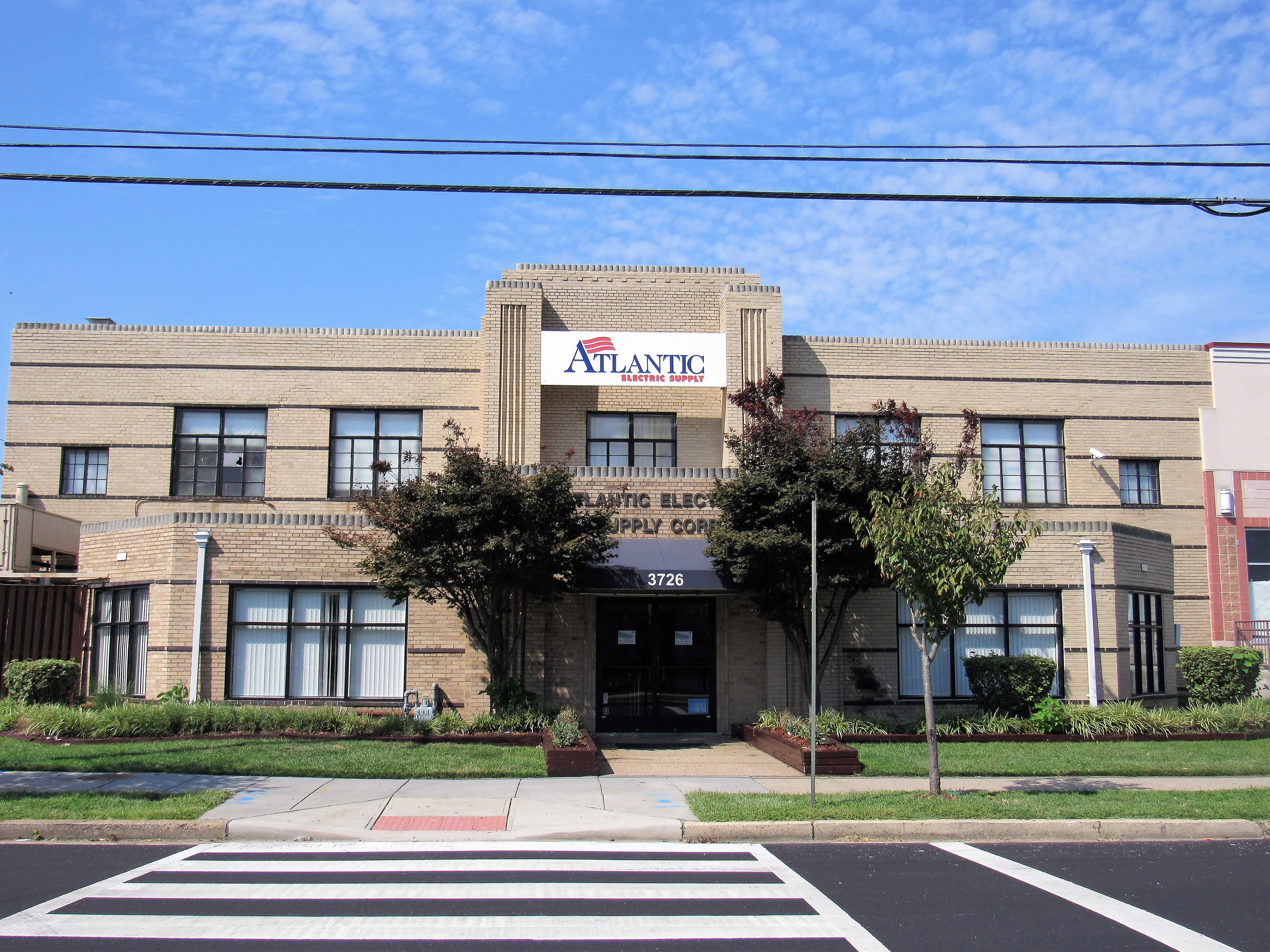
- Brookland Bowling Alleys in 2019

- Location within District of Columbia Location within the United States
- Location: 3726 10th Street, N.E., Washington, D.C.
- Coordinates: 38°56′10″N 76°59′36″W
- Built: 1939
- Architect: William Edward St. Cyr Barrington
- Architectural style: Art Deco
- NRHP reference No.: 100004306
- Added to NRHP: August 19, 2019

The Brookland Bowling Alleys is an Art Deco-style building in the Brookland neighborhood of Washington, D.C., that housed a bowling alley from its construction in 1939 until 1950. The building was listed on the National Register of Historic Places in 2019.

== History ==
The building was constructed as a duckpin bowling alley in 1938 and 1939 for the Brookland Recreation Center, Inc., on 10th St. NE in the Washington, D.C., neighborhood of Brookland. It was designed by William Edward St. Cyr Barrington, an architect who had studied under Jules Henri de Sibour, in the Art Deco style. The building was initially one story tall, but a second story was added within a year of its opening.

Bowling saw a boom in popularity in this period as a form of cheap entertainment during the Great Depression. At the time of the Brookland Bowling Alleys' construction, there were 13 other commercial bowling alleys in D.C.

The Brookland Bowling Alleys was managed by prominent local bowlers. It operated for just over 10 years, until a major fire damaged the structure in 1950. The blaze was attributed to "a cigarette, defective wiring or spontaneous combustion." The building was restored under Barrington's supervision, but it was repurposed as a wholesale store for electric lighting, parts, and appliances. It is currently occupied by Atlantic Electric Supply Corp.

The Brookland Bowling Alleys building is one of only a handful of remaining structures that once housed bowling alleys in D.C. The city's Historic Preservation Office described it as a "visual landmark of the neighborhood." It was added to the National Register of Historic Places on August 19, 2019.

== See also ==
- National Register of Historic Places listings in the District of Columbia
