= Project on Government Oversight =

American nonpartisan government watchdog

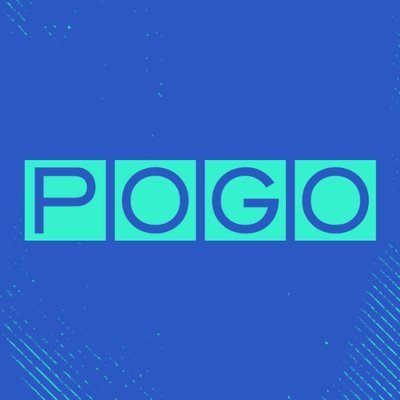
- Abbreviation: POGO
- Formation: February 1981
- Founder: Dina Rasor
- Type: 501(c)(3)
- Purpose: Government watchdog
- Headquarters: Hiram W. Johnson House
- Location: Washington, D.C.
- Executive Director and President: Danielle Brian
- Website: pogo.org

The Project on Government Oversight (POGO) is a nonpartisan nonprofit government watchdog group based in Washington, D.C.

== History ==
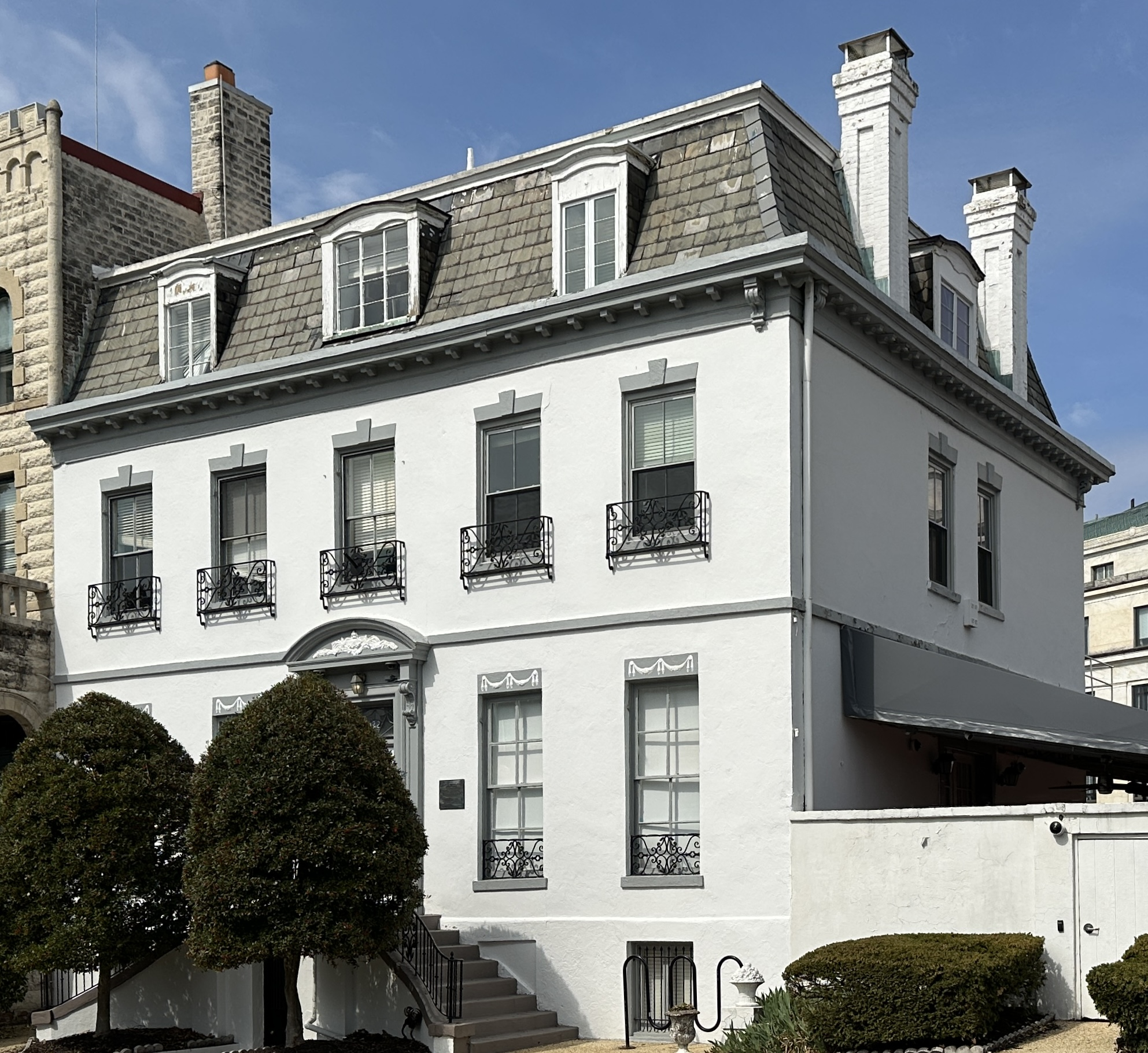
The POGO office is located in the Hiram W. Johnson House in Washington, D.C.

The Project on Military Procurement, an arm of the National Taxpayers Legal Fund, was founded by Dina Rasor in February 1981. The Project's mission was to make the public aware of "waste, fraud, and fat" in U.S. defense spending, according to Rasor. In the organization's early days, Rasor worked with whistleblowers to expose design flaws in the M1 Abrams tank, which had undergone a "shocking (cost) increase" in 1980, according to Rasor. The Project first gained widespread attention in the early 1980s for publishing reports on "outrageously overpriced military spending", including a $7,600 coffee maker and a $436 hammer. These prices were actually an artifact of government accounting rules, and include not just the cost of the equipment but also a portion of the overhead cost of the entire project they were associated with.

The organization expanded its scope beyond military spending and changed its name to the Project on Government Oversight (POGO) in 1990. Danielle Brian joined POGO as its executive director in 1993.

Other watchdog organizations have folded into POGO over the years. In 2012, the Straus Military Reform Project of the Center for Defense Information joined POGO. In 2016, the Center for Effective Government (known as OMB Watch until 2013) folded and became part of POGO.

== Board of directors ==
The organization's board of directors includes Harper's Magazine editor Andrew Cockburn, law professor Lia Epperson, former judge Wallace B. Jefferson, lawyer Debra Katz, and political scientist Norman Ornstein.

== Activities ==
=== Cancellation of the Superconducting Super Collider ===
POGO contributed to the successful effort to cancel Department of Energy's Superconducting Super Collider project, which had already lost a 1992 vote in the House of Representatives as its cost estimates ballooned from $4.4 billion to $12 billion. In June 1993, POGO publicized a Department of Energy Inspector General report it had received in draft form from a whistleblower. The Inspector General investigated $500,000 in questionable expenses over three years, including $12,000 for Christmas parties, $25,000 for catered lunches, and $21,000 for the purchase and maintenance of office plants. The report also concluded that there was inadequate documentation for $203 million in project spending, or 40% of the money spent up to that point.

=== Area 51 hazardous waste investigation ===
POGO reported that in 1995 it was contacted by a woman who claimed her husband had died as the result of being exposed to toxic waste while working at Area 51. At the time, the U.S. government denied the existence of the Area 51, but POGO turned to George Washington University law professor Jonathan Turley to sue the government on behalf of the woman and six former Area 51 workers for illnesses and death as a result of toxic waste exposure at Area 51. POGO executive director Danielle Brian said that, during the litigation, the organization obtained an unclassified Area 51 security manual, which POGO gave to Turley and the plaintiffs so they could prove Area 51 existed. The Air Force then retroactively classified the manual, "threatened to prosecute anyone who had it in their possession, and demanded access to all of POGO's files to determine what other 'classified' information POGO possessed," Brian wrote in a signed legal declaration. The court ruled that the plaintiffs' case could not be proved because it could not confirm the existence of Area 51, however Area 51 was thereafter required to comply with environmental laws. In 2013, the government confirmed that Area 51 exists.

=== Unpaid oil royalties investigation ===
POGO released a series of reports from 1995 to 1997 that said the U.S. federal government was owed billions of dollars in unpaid oil royalties from companies that drilled oil from public lands. The reports claimed that the Department of the Interior's Mineral Management Service had a "sweetheart" relationship with oil companies that prevented the agency from going after the industry for moneys due.

=== Federal Contractor Misconduct Database ===
In 2002, POGO launched the Federal Contractor Misconduct Database, a website that compiles instances of "misconduct and alleged misconduct" by the top government contractors since 1995, according to the website. POGO's database was the inspiration for a similar federal government database that was created by the 2009 National Defense Authorization Act. When POGO updated its database in 2010, it was reported that the organization had "found 642 instances since 1995 of misconduct by the top 100 firms, resulting in $18.7 billion in penalties."

=== Lawsuit against John Ashcroft ===
In 2004, POGO filed a lawsuit against then-U.S. Attorney General John Ashcroft for illegally retroactively classifying documents critical of the Federal Bureau of Investigation. The classification came to light after Sibel Edmonds, an FBI translator, discovered that intercepted memos relevant to the September 11 terrorist attacks had been ignored due to poor translation. POGO won the lawsuit in 2005.

=== Congressional Oversight Initiative ===
In 2006, POGO launched a series of nonpartisan trainings to teach congressional staff how to conduct oversight and investigations. Since then, POGO has hosted monthly training, as well as specialized training upon request, according to the organization's website.

=== Ending the Royalty-In-Kind program ===
In 2008, POGO released a report that documented corruption and mismanagement in the Department of the Interior's Minerals Management Service (MMS) royalty-in-kind program. The investigation revealed inadequate royalty accounting, as well as the provision of sex, drugs, and other favors to MMS officials by oil company representatives in exchange for favorable business deals. Following this report and others by the federal Government Accountability Office, the royalty in-kind program was terminated, and MMS was split into three different bureaus.

=== Kabul embassy investigation ===
In 2009, POGO conducted an investigation into ArmorGroup, a private security contractor in charge of protecting the U.S. embassy in Kabul, Afghanistan. POGO uncovered and released documents, photos, and videos depicting drunken behavior, nudity, and hazing among the guards. POGO's investigation led to the dismissal of several managers and eight guards, the resignation of an additional two guards, and ultimately, the cancellation of the U.S. military's contract with ArmorGroup.

=== Nuclear facility safety investigations ===
POGO has conducted numerous investigations into the Los Alamos National Laboratory. LANL has been the subject of several controversies in the past, including employees charging personal expenses to government accounts, lost equipment or documents (including hundreds of computers containing classified information), and a memorandum to employees to "be careful what they say" to safety and security inspectors. In 2009, 69 computers disappeared, although plant officials insisted that the computers did not contain the most highly classified information. 2009 also saw a scare in which 2.2 pounds of missing plutonium prompted a Department of Energy investigation into the plant. The investigation found that the "missing plutonium" was a result of miscalculation by LANL's statisticians and did not actually exist, but the investigation did lead to heavy criticism of the plant by the DOE for security flaws and weaknesses that the DOE claimed to have found.

=== FDA conflicts of interest investigation ===
Starting in 2011, POGO conducted an investigation into conflicts of interest of an advisory committee at the Food and Drug Administration that was reviewing the Yaz and Yasmin birth control pills. POGO found that four members of the committee had ties to either the maker of the pills or the maker of a generic version, but did not announce the conflicts before endorsing the drugs. Both Yaz and Yasmin have been linked to fatal blood clots in some users.

=== Advocacy for Camp Lejeune victims ===
In 2012, POGO working with whistleblower retired Marine Corps Master Sgt. Jerry Ensminger, advocated for openness regarding toxic water contamination at Marine Corps Base Camp Lejeune in North Carolina. From 1953 until at least 1985, U.S. Marines and their families living at Camp Lejeune had used tap water that contained carcinogens and other harmful chemicals leaking from a nearby dump site for radioactive material. POGO and other organizations claimed in 2012 that the U.S. Navy and Marine Corps hid information about the nature and extent of the contamination, citing a report released by the Agency for Toxic Substances and Disease Registry that was redacted by the Navy. Later that year, the U.S. Senate voted to approve healthcare for those who lived at Camp Lejeune and suffered health problems. In 2017, the Department of Veterans' Affairs finalized rules to provide benefits for people who had been diagnosed with certain diseases as a result of living at Camp Lejeune.

=== Defense spending and Straus Military Reform Project ===
POGO has conducted many investigations into defense spending, particularly in cases where, "national security and needs of the troops have been compromised by greed, lack of oversight, and in many cases, sheer incompetence," according to its website. Some of the weapons systems that POGO has been critical of include the littoral combat ship, the F/A-22 fighter aircraft, and the F-35 joint strike fighter aircraft. On the other hand, POGO has supported the production of the A-10 aircraft for its relative effectiveness and inexpensiveness compared to what POGO considers more wasteful weapons.

In 2012, the Straus Military Reform Project of the Center for Defense Information moved to POGO with director and military analyst Winslow Wheeler. Wheeler retired in 2015.

=== Whistleblower protection ===
POGO, along with several other public interest groups, was involved in the investigation and trial of Scott Bloch, ex-head of the U.S. Office of Special Counsel (OSC). Bloch was accused by former OSC employees of ignoring and dismissing hundreds of whistleblower complaints, removing language guaranteeing protection against sexual orientation discrimination from OSC's website and official documents, and "relocating" several of his own employees who came forward with these allegations. When these accusations led to a congressional investigation of Bloch, Bloch allegedly hired a technology company to wipe the memory of his computer and several other OSC laptops in order to hide key evidence from the investigators. Bloch initially claimed that he ordered this as protection against a virus that had infected his computer, but he later admitted he was trying to withhold information. Bloch ultimately resigned his position as head of the OSC and pleaded guilty to withholding information from Congress.

POGO has worked to protect the rights of several specific whistleblowers—including Franz Gayl, who criticized military leaders' decision to not deliver protective armored vehicles called MRAPs to troops in Iraq and Afghanistan, and Lieutenant Colonel Daniel Davis, who challenged military leaders' depictions of the "rosy" situation on the ground in Afghanistan—by sending letters to Congress and the agencies involved.

== Whistleblower award incident ==
In 1998, POGO, the Department of Justice, and other plaintiffs filed a lawsuit under the False Claims Act, suing the largest oil and gas companies operating in the United States. The lawsuit alleged that the companies had defrauded the government by underpaying royalties owed for drilling on federal lands. By 2002, 15 companies had settled, paying a total of almost $440 million. POGO was awarded about $1.2 million from the settlements in 1998. That year, POGO shared its settlement with two federal employee whistleblowers, saying the payment was a "Public Service Award" to the whistleblowers.

Following the news of the award in 1999, U.S. Senator Frank Murkowski asked the General Accounting Office to investigate whether the payment represented "improper influence" on the Department of the Interior's new oil royalty valuation policy. The agency released a report in 2000 that said it appeared POGO paid the two employees to influence the Department of the Interior to take actions and make policies that benefited POGO. While calling the payments a "mistake" on POGO's part, U.S. Senator Jeff Bingaman disputed the agency's report, saying that it did not provide any evidence that the payments were improper.

In 2000, U.S. Representative Don Young threatened bringing a Contempt of Congress charge against POGO, after the organization refused to comply with a House of Representatives subpoena for documents relating to the payments. Young later withdrew the charge, lacking the votes for passage. The report, hearings, and contempt threat were described by Martin Lobel, an attorney involved in the case, as being driven by "oil company congressional lapdogs" bent on hounding oil industry enemies and derailing regulatory reform.

In 2003, the Department of Justice filed a civil action against POGO and one of the federal employees, and a U.S. district judge ruled in favor of the agency. POGO appealed the case and went to trial in 2008, where a jury found POGO and the federal employee had violated the law. The judge ordered POGO to pay only $120,000 because he said the organization had acted "in good faith" when they made the payments. However, in 2010, the appeals court found the district judge had made a mistake in his directions to the jury. POGO and the agency went to trial again in 2012, but a mistrial was declared after jurors couldn't come to a unanimous verdict. A month later, in 2013, the Department of Justice said it would not litigate on the matter for a third time.

== Publications ==
In 2002, POGO, Government Accountability Project, and Public Employees for Environmental Responsibility co-published the book The Art of Anonymous Activism: Serving the Public while Surviving Public Service. It is described as a "how-to guide" for government employees who wish to expose corruption or misconduct in their organization without endangering their careers.

In 2009, POGO published The Art of Congressional Oversight: A User's Guide to Doing It Right, which is a guide geared towards congressional staffers; an updated second edition was published in 2015.

== Awards ==
In 2009, POGO received the Society of Professional Journalists' Sunshine Award for its work uncovering wasteful spending in the Air Force, investigating the Minerals Management Service at the Department of the Interior, and compiling the Federal Contractor Misconduct Database.

In 2015, POGO received five awards from the Washington, DC, chapter of the Society of Professional Journalists. POGO won the Non-breaking News Award for its coverage of issues at the Department of Veterans' Affairs; two Investigative Reporting Awards for its coverage of the revolving door in government and problems at the Department of Justice; the Series award also for its coverage of the revolving door; and the Robert D.G. Lewis Watchdog Award also for its coverage of the Department of Justice.

== See also ==
- Center for Defense Information
- Center for Effective Government
