= Parkington =

Parkington may refer to:

- John Parkington, professor in archaeology and hunter-gatherers, paleoenvironmental reconstruction and human ecology, prehistoric art, and coastal archaeology
- Ballston Common Mall, Arlington, Virginia, originally named Parkington Shopping Center, one of the first shopping centers in the Washington, D.C., area
- Hiram W. Johnson House, Washington, D.C., also known as Parkington, on the National Register of Historic Places
- Suzie and Augustus Parkington, main characters of the 1944 film Mrs. Parkington, played by Greer Garson and Walter Pidgeon respectively
- Samantha Parkington, a doll in the American Girl line
