= Brooks Mansion =

Historic house in Washington, D.C., United States

- U.S. National Register of Historic Places
- D.C. Inventory of Historic Sites
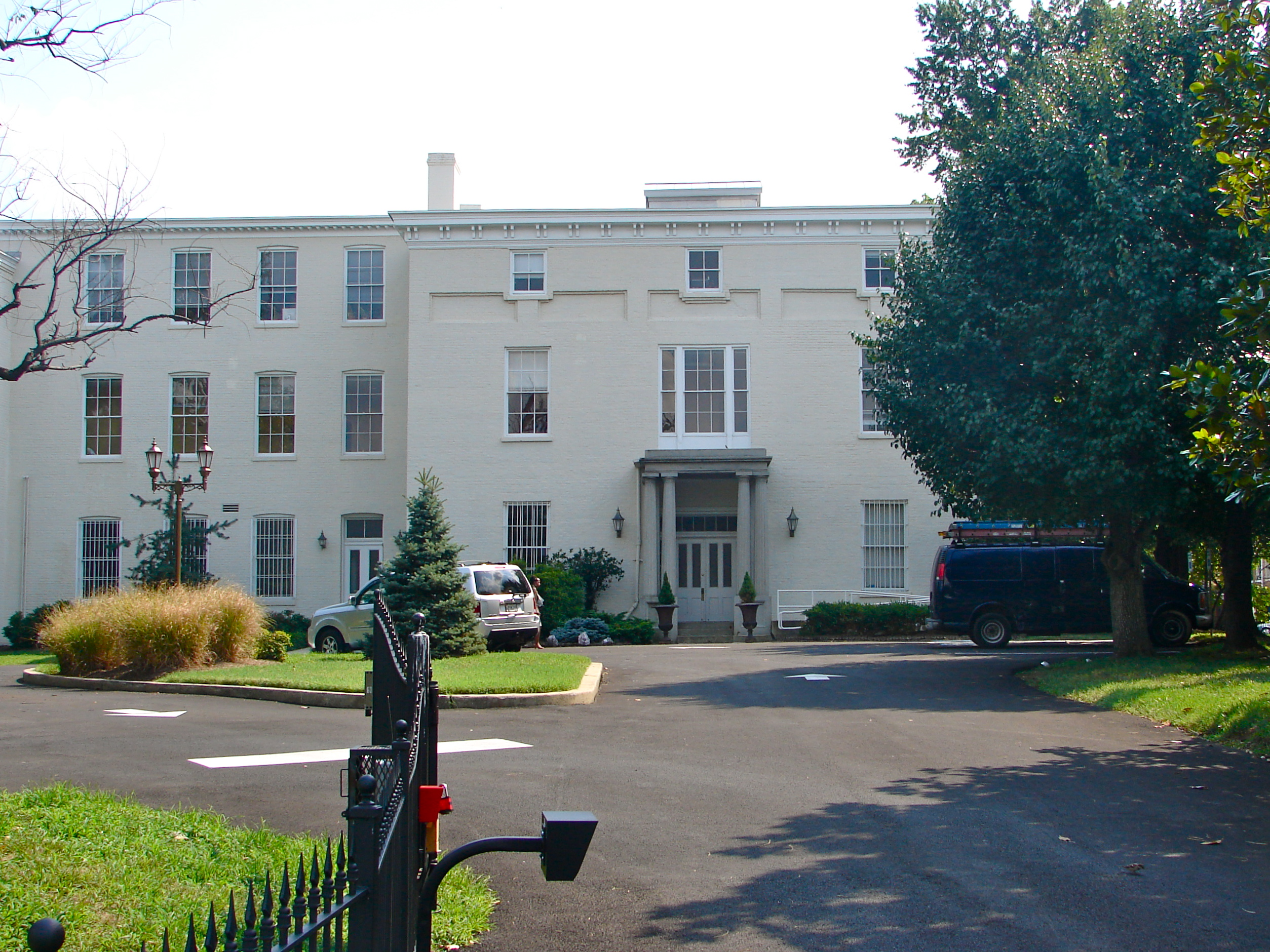
- Brooks Mansion in 2011

- Location within District of Columbia
- Location: 901 Newton Street, N.E., Washington, D.C.
- Coordinates: 38°55′58″N 76°59′37″W
- Area: 1.7 acres (0.69 ha)
- Built: 1836–1840
- Architectural style: Greek Revival
- NRHP reference No.: 75002045

Significant dates
- Added to NRHP: July 17, 1975
- Designated DCIHS: April 29, 1975

Brooks Mansion is a Greek Revival plantation house and Category II Landmark owned by the District of Columbia government. It is located at 901 Newton Street, Northeast, Washington, D.C., in the Brookland neighborhood, next to the Brookland–CUA (WMATA station).

== History ==
The house was built around 1840 by Col. Jehiel Brooks, a veteran of the War of 1812 who married Ann Margaret Queen, daughter of One of the largest landowners in the District of Columbia. After returning from the Red River Indian Agency, they lived on a 246-acre plantation that they dubbed Bellair.

In 1887, the house and land were sold to an Ida U. Marshall, who sold to Benjamin F. Leighton and Richard E. Pairo. They subdivided Bellair, and developed the suburb of Brookland. The mansion house and 2 acres were sold to Elizabeth Varney, who operated a boarding house.

In 1891, the Marist Brothers bought the Brooks mansion. Three years later, they added a wing to the house. Eventually, they sold the house to the Benedictine Sisters.

In 1905, the Benedictine Sisters of Elizabeth, New Jersey moved to the Brooks Mansion. In 1906, they founded St. Anthony's Academy for young children, and operated a shelter for women.

In 1911, the Catholic University of America began educating the sisters at the mansion.

In 1928, women were admitted to Catholic University of America, and the mansion became St. Anthony's High School.

=== Public ownership ===
In 1970, Washington Metropolitan Area Transit Authority bought the mansion. It was listed in the National Register of Historic Places on July 17, 1975. It was bought by the DC government in 1979, and is used by the Public Access Corporation for the District of Columbia (DCTV). It was named as an endangered place by the D.C. Preservation League in 1999.

== See also ==
- National Register of Historic Places listings in Washington, D.C.
