= Children's Country Home =

Building in Washington, D.C.

- U.S. National Register of Historic Places
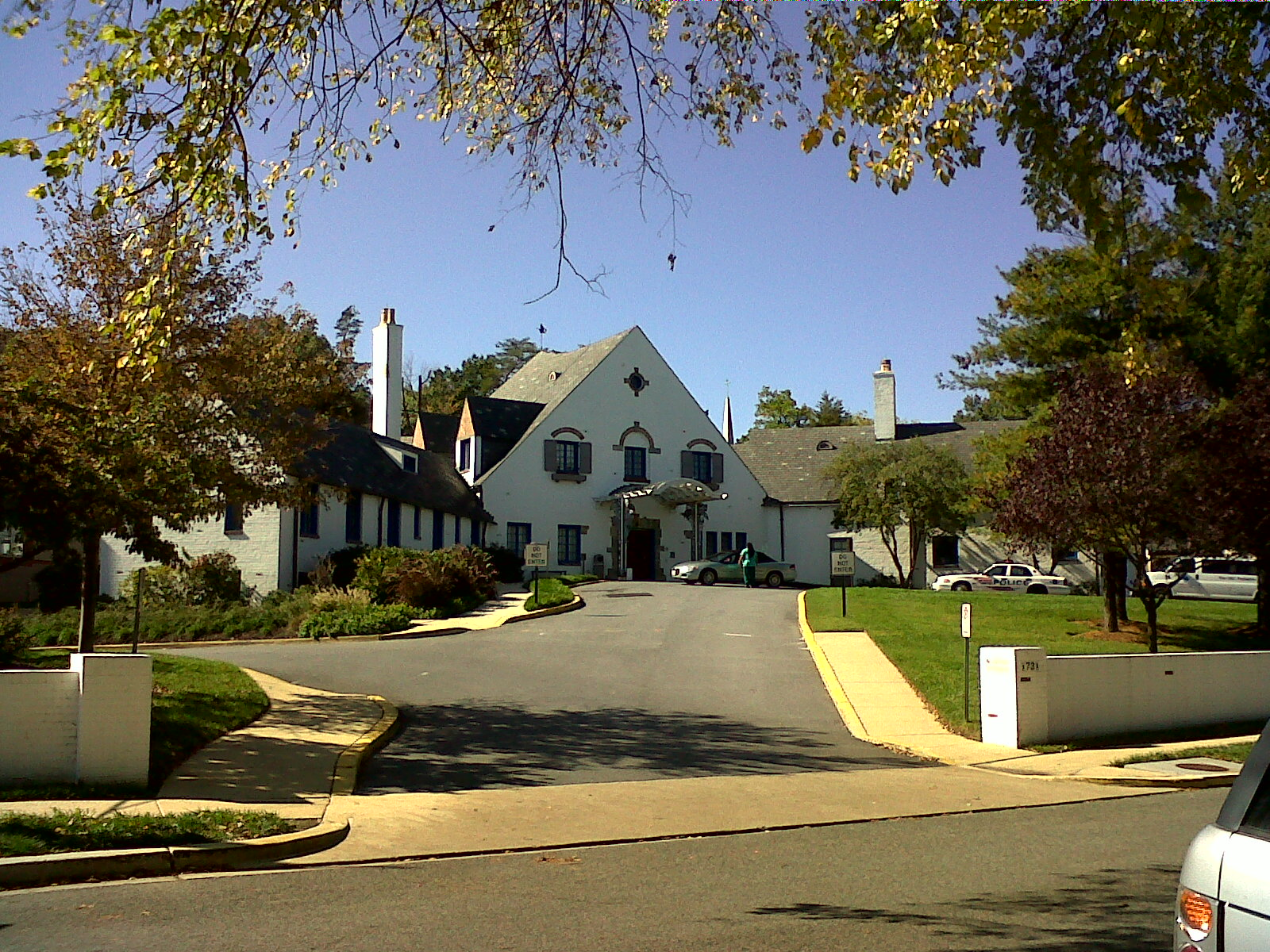
- Children's Country Home in 2011

- Location within District of Columbia Location within the United States
- Location: 1731 Bunker Hill Road, NE; Washington, D.C. United States
- Coordinates: 38°56′29″N 76°58′39″W
- Built: 1866
- Architect: Wyeth and Sullivan
- Architectural style: Norman cottage-style
- NRHP reference No.: 03001254
- Added to NRHP: December 9, 2003

The Children's Country Home, also known as the Hospital for Sick Children, is a United States historic building located in Washington, D.C.'s Woodridge neighborhood.

== History ==
Founded as a summer camp for sick children, the Norman cottage building was built in 1929 to 1930. It was designed by Nathan C. Wyeth, and Francis P. Sullivan. First Lady Lou Henry Hoover laid the cornerstone. There were additions in 1968, and 1991 to 1992.

== See also ==
- National Register of Historic Places listings in the District of Columbia
