= United Brick Corporation Brick Complex =

- U.S. National Register of Historic Places
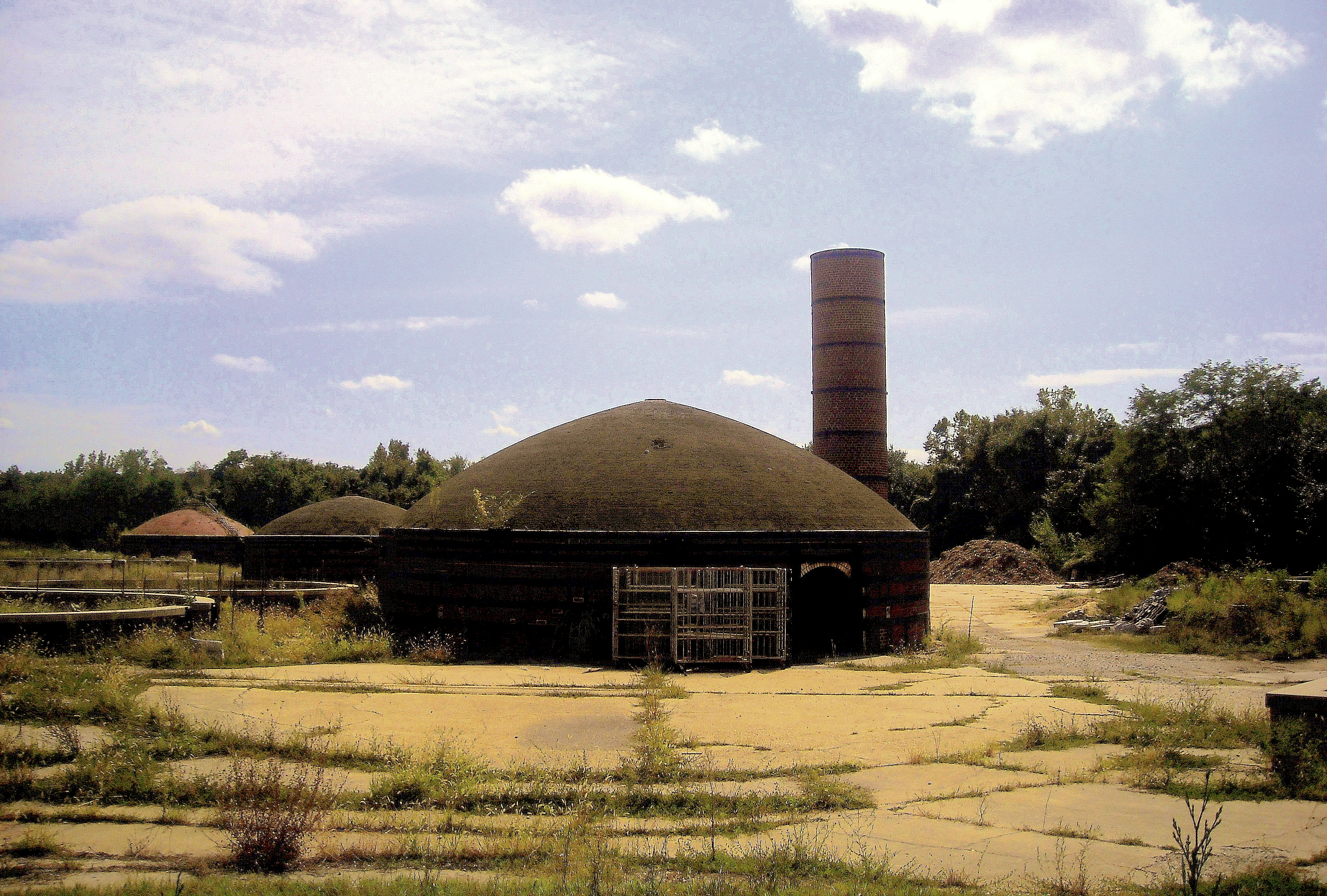

- Location within District of Columbia
- Coordinates: 38°54′58″N 76°58′05″W
- Built: 1927-1949
- NRHP reference No.: 78003061
- Added to NRHP: October 3, 1978

The United Brick Corporation Brick Complex, also known as the New York Avenue Brickworks, is a historic industrial site. It is located on the 2800 block of New York Avenue, NE in Washington, D.C. on the grounds of the United States National Arboretum. The site sits on federal land, and access by the public is restricted.

The kilns represent the only remaining brickyard in Washington, D.C., and one of the few extant examples of the rounded "beehive" kiln style. The structures are constructed of red common brick, lined with heat-resistant firebrick and capped with arched, brick roofs. The complex also contained eight exhaust stacks. There is a small gauge rail system, with a standard rail siding. A factory building and drying shed, which contains 38 drying tunnels, are also still visible on the site.

== History ==
Rectangular brick kilns were originally built on the site going back to at least 1909. It wasn't until 1927–1931 that nine of the now-iconic, circular beehive kilns were constructed. Three additional kilns were built at a later date. A number of companies operated at the site, including the Hudson Brick and Supply Company and the United Clay Products Company. Locally, the West Brothers Brick Company also manufactured bricks using beehive kilns, but that operation was closed in 1942 for the construction of the Pentagon.

The complex permanently closed in 1972, and was transferred to the United States Department of Agriculture in 1976. On October 3, 1978 the complex was added to the National Register of Historic Places.

== See also ==
- National Register of Historic Places listings in Washington, D.C.
