= Strand Theater (Washington, D.C.) =

- U.S. National Register of Historic Places
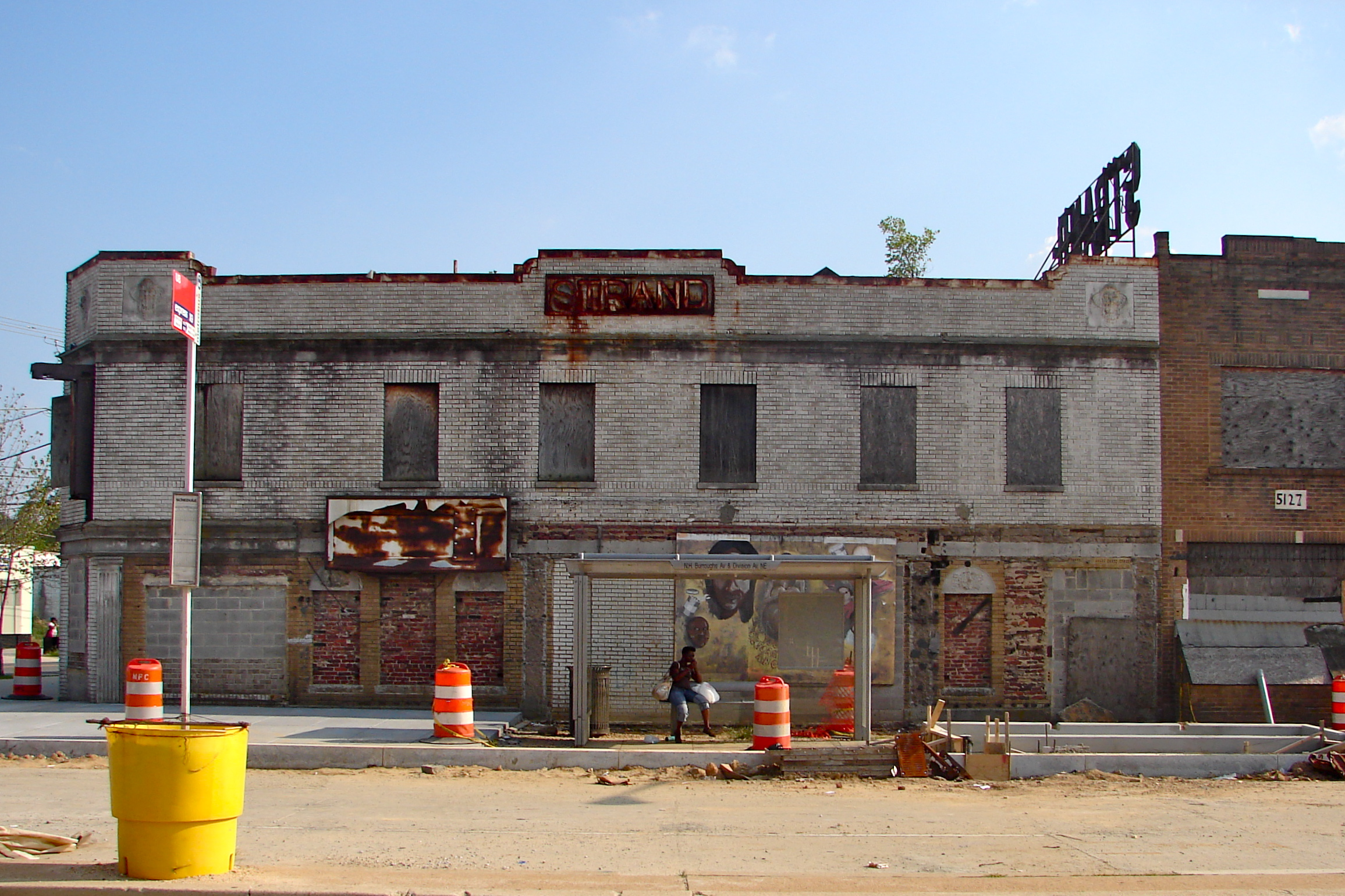

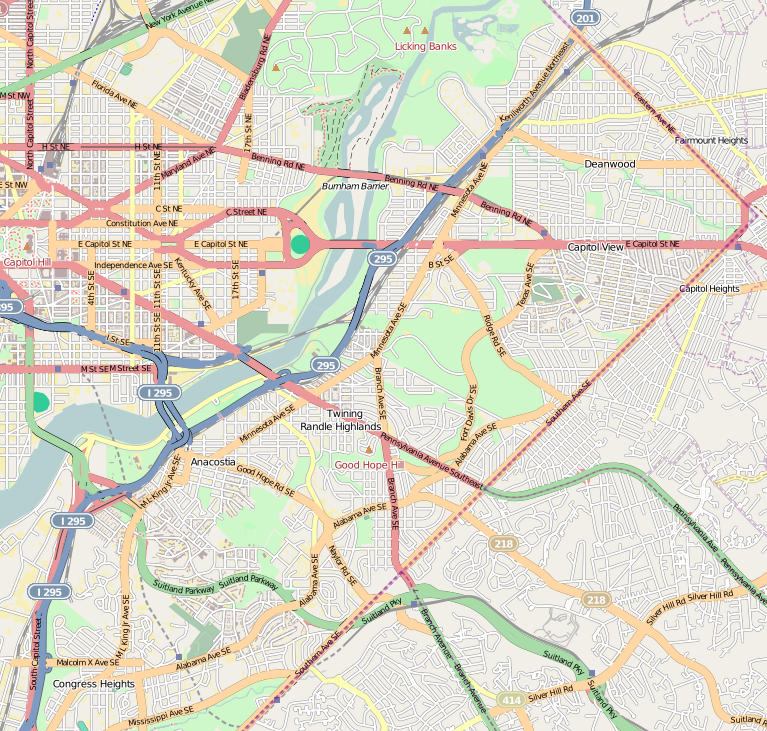
- Location within Washington, D.C. Location within the District of Columbia Location within the United States
- Location: 5129–5131 Nannie Helen Burroughs Avenue, N.E. Washington, D.C.
- Coordinates: 38°53′53.5″N 76°55′33.7″W
- Built: 1928
- NRHP reference No.: 08001093
- Added to NRHP: November 25, 2008

The Strand Theater is an abandoned neighborhood movie theater, located at 5129–5131 Nannie Helen Burroughs Avenue, Northeast, Washington, D.C., in the Deanwood neighborhood.

== History ==
Abe E. Lichtman opened the movie theater, on November 3, 1928.

The city bought the property out of foreclosure for $230,000 in September 2006. Redevelopment was delayed. It was named an endangered place by the D.C. Preservation League in 2007. It was placed on the National Register of Historic Places on November 25, 2008. In 2010, developers received approval of a plan for redevelopment, of the theater, by the Board of Zoning Appeals.

== See also ==
- National Register of Historic Places listings in the District of Columbia
- Theater in Washington D.C.
