= Jehiel Brooks =

Soldier and landowner (1797–1886)

Colonel Jehiel Brooks (April 8, 1797 Albans, Vermont - February 6, 1886) was a soldier, territorial governor, and plantation owner.

== Life ==
He was First Lieutenant, in the First Regiment of Infantry with the Ohio Militia, in the War of 1812. He came to the District of Columbia to secure political appointment, but with the exception of an appointment in the Red River Indian Agency in Louisiana during the administration of Andrew Jackson (1829–1837), Brooks had little luck. Instead, he assumed the role of the gentleman farmer on a tract of land adjacent to property that later became part of The Catholic University of America (CUA).

One of the largest holders of real estate in the District, Nicholas Louis Queen ran the Queen's Hotel near the Capitol until his death in 1850. The Brooks and Queens families united in 1828, when Jehiel Brooks and Ann Margaret Queen, the daughter of Nicholas Queen, married. They built the Brooks Mansion.

The son, John Henry Brooks later sold his parents' real estate to early twentieth-century developers of the Brookland neighborhood.

== See also ==
- United States v. Brooks (1850)
