= First Baptist Church of Deanwood =

Historic church in Washington, D.C., United States

- U.S. National Register of Historic Places
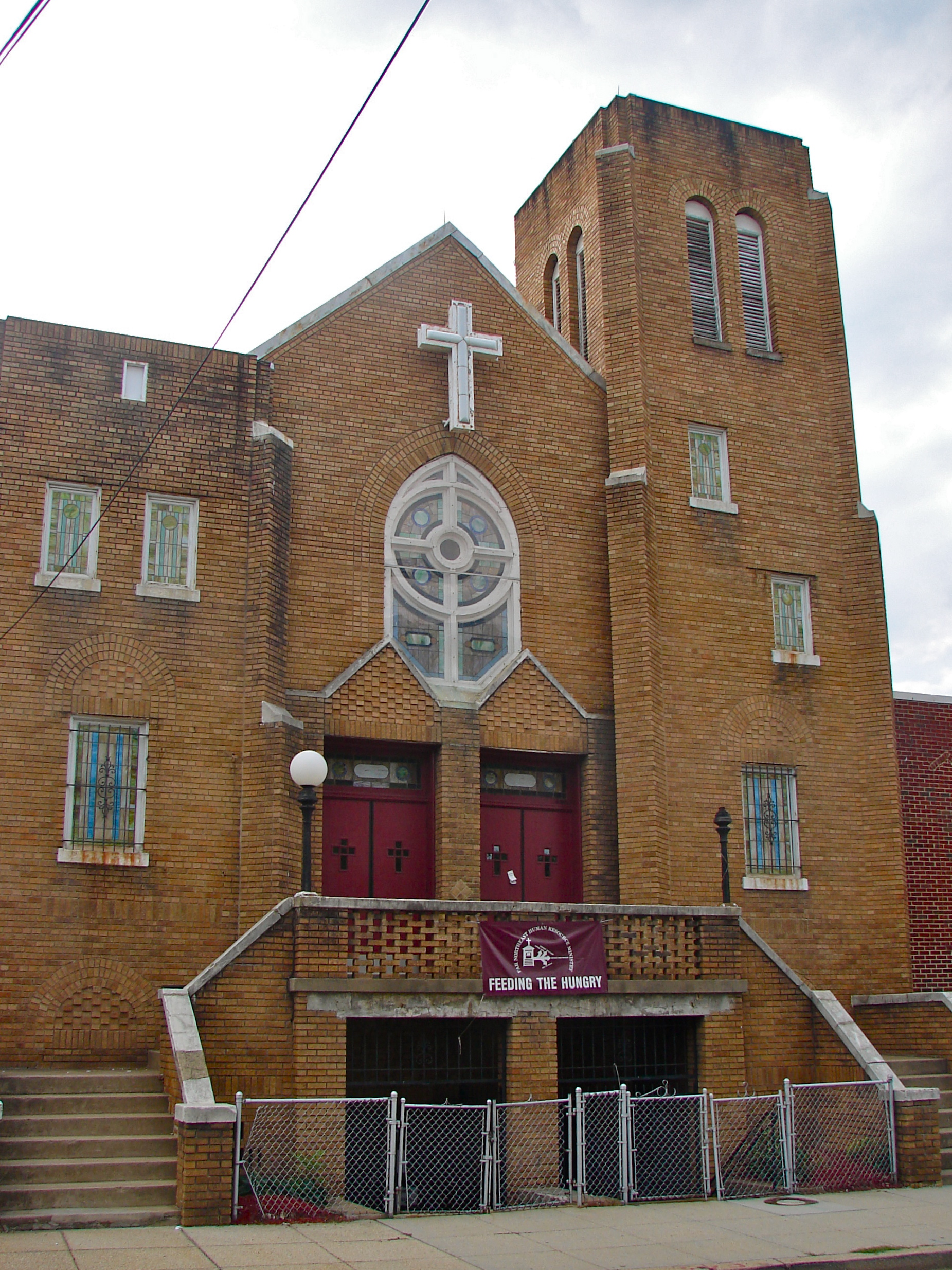

- Location within the District of Columbia Location within the United States
- Location: 1008 45th St. N.E., Washington, D.C.
- Coordinates: 38°54′12″N 76°56′17″W
- Area: less than one acre
- Built: 1938
- Architect: George Alonzo Ferguson, Roscoe Ingersoll Vaughn
- Architectural style: Late Gothic Revival
- NRHP reference No.: 08000720
- Added to NRHP: July 24, 2008

First Baptist Church of Deanwood is a Baptist church at 1008 45th Street in Northeast, Washington, D.C., in the Deanwood neighborhood.

It was built in 1938, and added to the National Register of Historic Places in 2008. It was added to the District of Columbia Inventory of Historic Sites the same year.

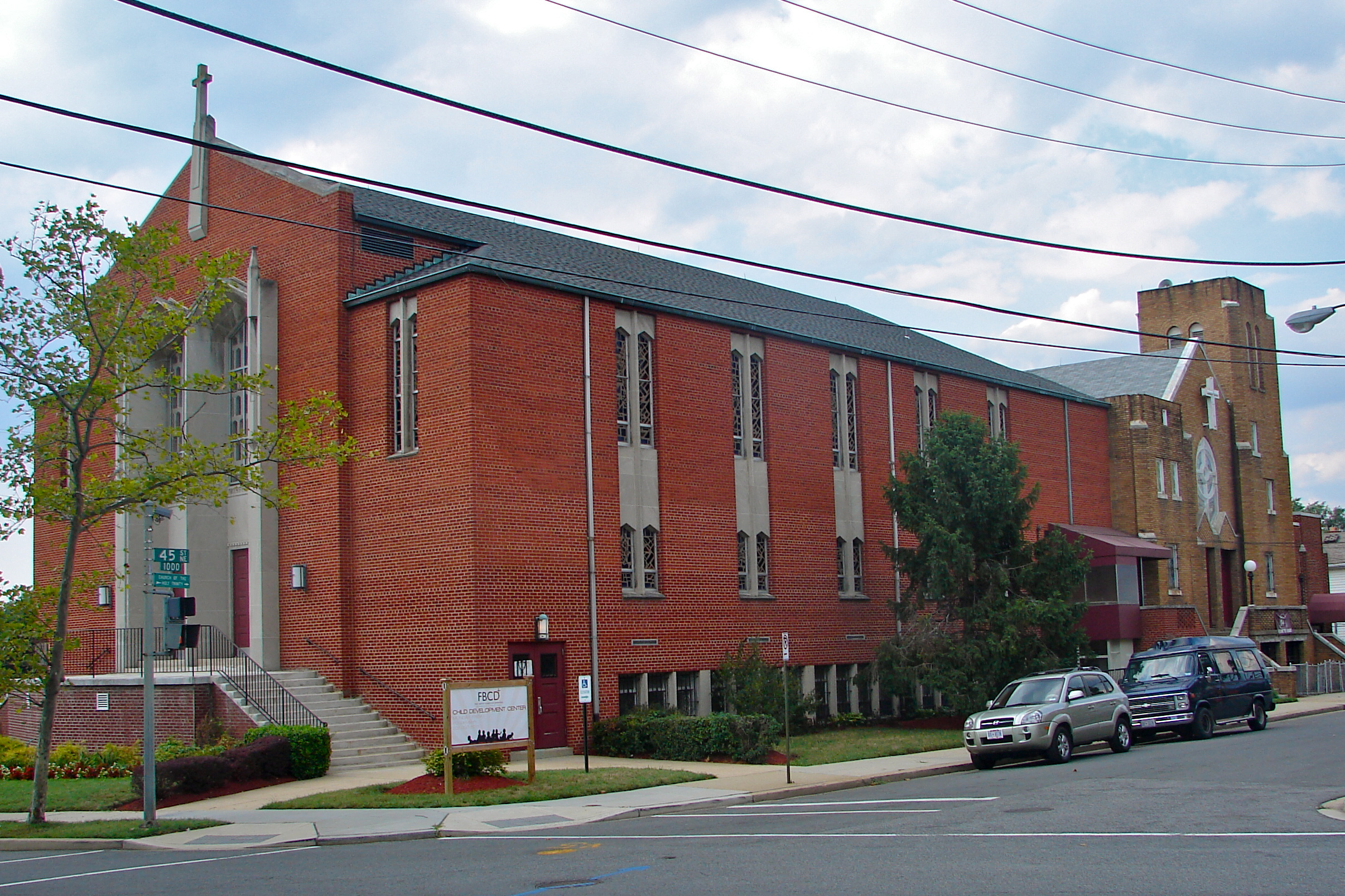
The new church in front of the old church building

A new church was completed in 1961, just south of the old church. The new church is now the main location for worship services and the old building is used for youth activities.
