= Dahlgreen Courts =

- U.S. National Register of Historic Places
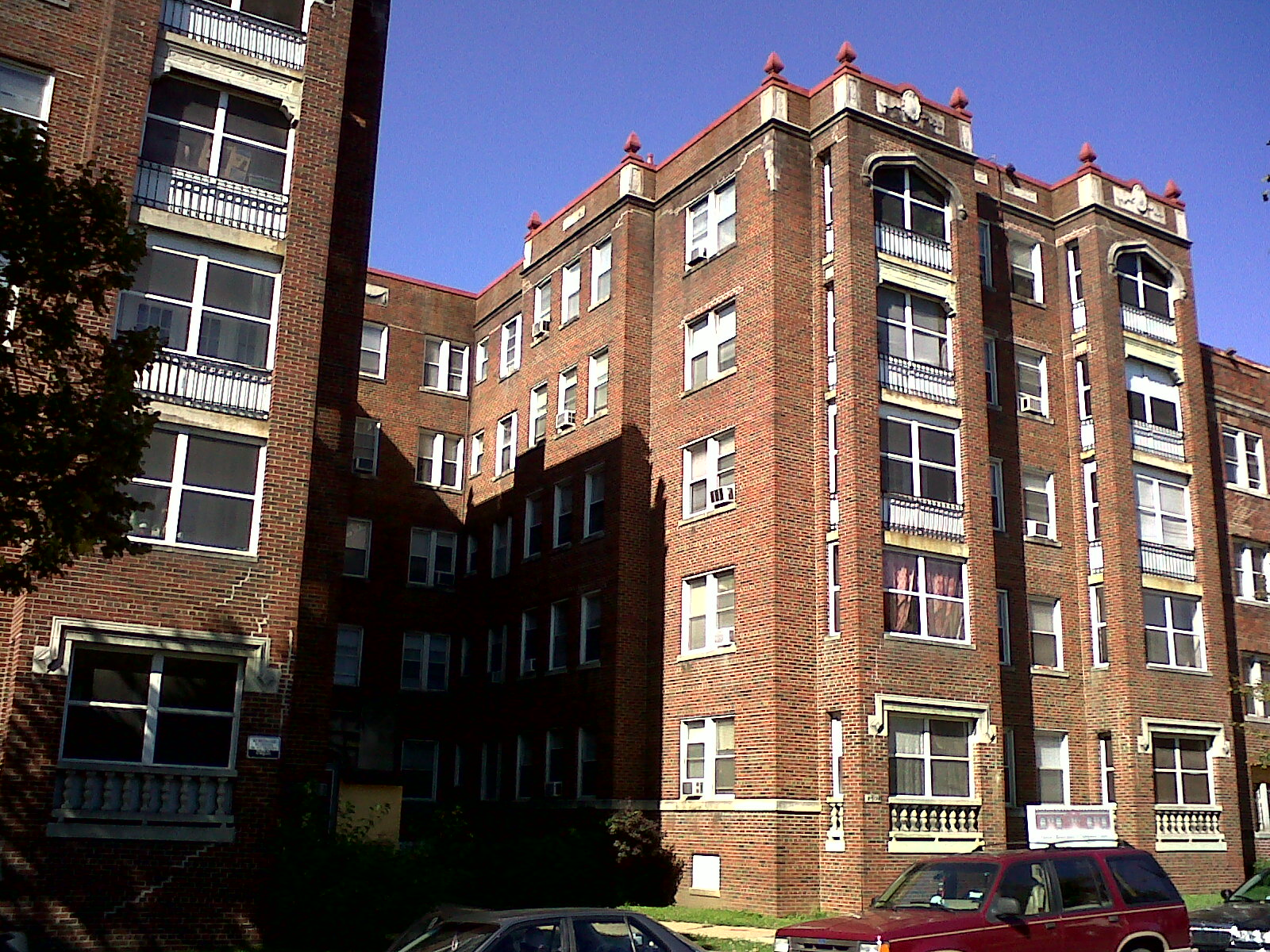
- Dahlgreen Courts in 2011

- Location within District of Columbia
- Location: 2504-2520 10th St., NE; Washington, D.C.
- Coordinates: 38°55′22″N 76°59′34″W
- Built: 1927, 1928-1929
- Architect: George Santmyers
- MPS: Apartment Buildings in Washington, DC, MPS
- NRHP reference No.: 10000901
- Added to NRHP: November 10, 2010

Dahlgreen Courts is a historic structure located in the Brookland neighborhood in the Northeast quadrant of Washington, D.C. The complex is made up of two buildings that contain 96 units. They were designed by George T. Santmyers and they were completed in stages between 1927 and 1929. The complex was listed on both the District of Columbia Inventory of Historic Sites and on the National Register of Historic Places in 2010.
