= Roosevelt Apartment Building =

- U.S. National Register of Historic Places
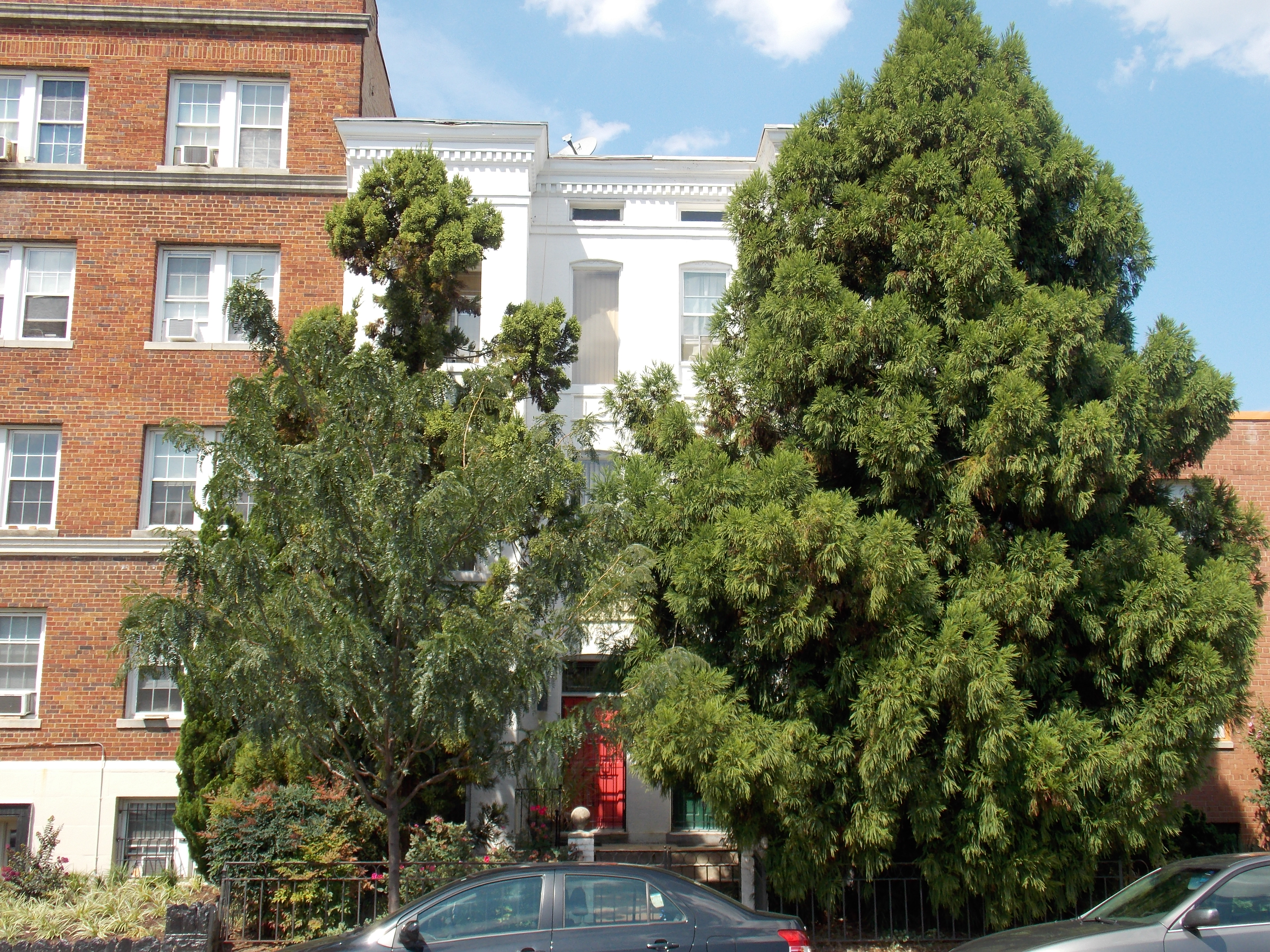

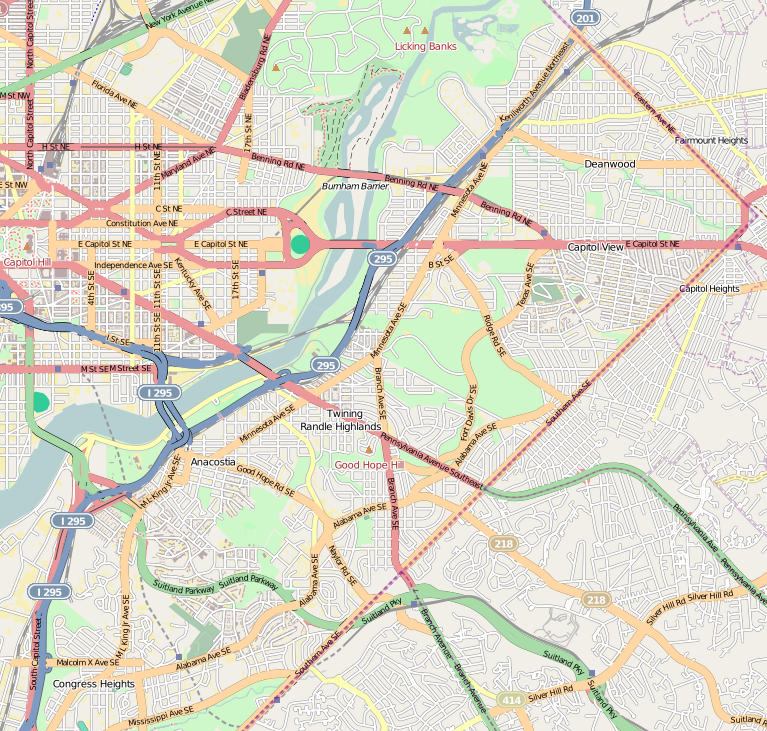
- Location within Washington, D.C. Location within the District of Columbia Location within the United States
- Location: 1116-1118 F St., NE; Washington, D.C.
- Coordinates: 38°53′50″N 76°59′27″W
- Built: 1898
- Architect: C. Graham, & Son
- Architectural style: Late Victorian
- MPS: Apartment Buildings in Washington, DC, MPS
- NRHP reference No.: 94001045
- Added to NRHP: September 7, 1994

The Roosevelt Apartment Building is an historic structure located in the Capitol Hill neighborhood in the Northeast quadrant of Washington, D.C.

The building is a multiple-family double row-house that was built as a middle-class dwelling. C. Graham, & Son designed the Late Victorian building, which was completed in 1898.

The structure exemplifies apartment building evolution from the vernacular row-house form. It was listed on the National Register of Historic Places in 1994.
