= Brookland (Washington, D.C.) =

- Neighborhood of Washington, D.C.
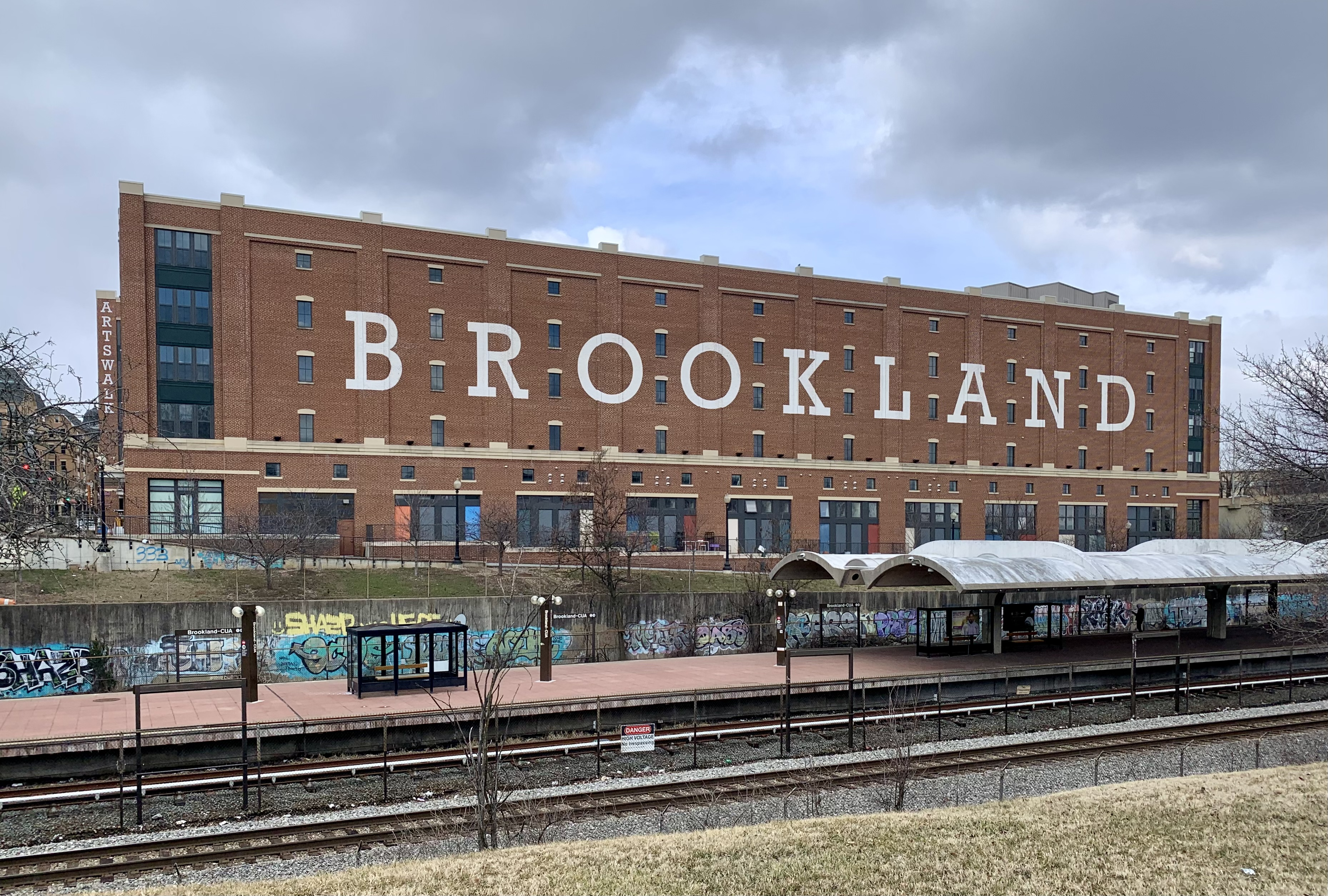
- Brookland in 2022 with the Brookland–CUA station Metro station in the foreground

- Brookland within the District of Columbia
- Coordinates: 38.9275°N 76.99°W
- Country: United States
- District: Washington, D.C.
- Ward: Ward 5

Government
  - Councilmember: Zachary Parker
- Postal code: ZIP code

Brookland, also known as Little Rome or Little Vatican, is a neighborhood located in the Northeast (NE) quadrant of Washington, D.C. Bounded by Fort Totten Metro Train tracks NE, and Brookland CUA Metro train tracks, Taylor Street NE, Rhode Island Avenue NE, South Dakota Avenue NE. It is best known for its numerous Catholic institutions, including schools, religious communities, shrines, institutes, and other organizations built and based around the Catholic University of America.

Historically centered along 12th Street NE, Brookland is bounded by Taylor Street NE and Michigan Avenue NE to the northwest; by Rhode Island Avenue NE to the southeast; by South Dakota Avenue NE to the northeast; and by subway (Washington Metro's Red Line) and train (CSX) tracks to the west.

The western boundary of the railroad tracks originated with the completion of the former Metropolitan Branch of the Baltimore and Ohio Railroad in 1873, which now incorporates the Washington Metro's Red Line. Brookland's boundaries stretches to the National Shrine and includes Catholic University.

The Washington Metropolitan Area Transit Authority (WMATA) provides public transportation services to and throughout Brookland, with two subway stations and several bus lines. Most of the Brookland neighborhood is served by the Washington Metropolitan Area Red Line Brookland–CUA Metro station, located between Monroe Street NE and Michigan Avenue NE. A small portion of the Brookland neighborhood located on Rhode Island Avenue NE is served by the Red Line Rhode Island Avenue Metro Station.

== History ==
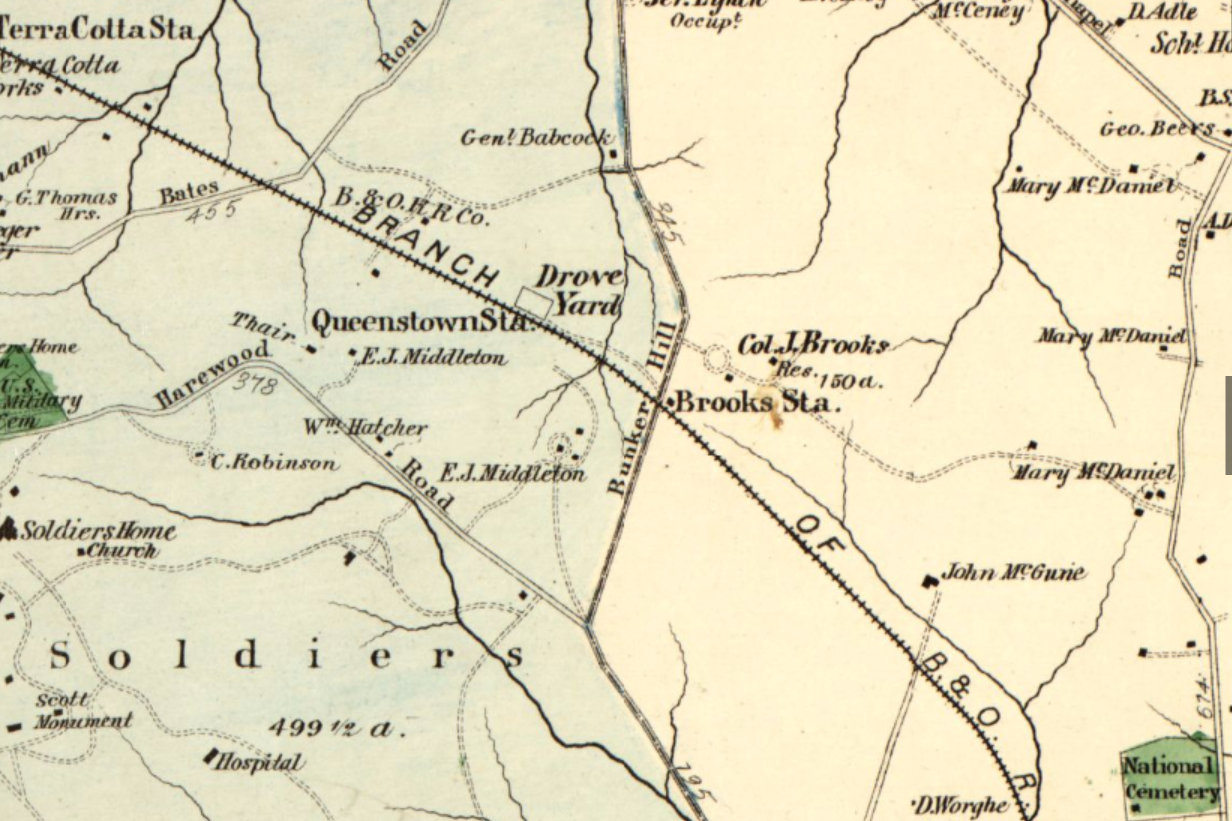
Map of Brookland, 1879

In 1632 the English Crown unilaterally took the land from the Piscataway Natives who inhabited the Potomac-Anacostia region. King Charles I of England in turn granted the land, which was to become the state of Maryland, to George Calvert, whose interest in the colony lay in "the sacred duty of finding a refuge for his Roman Catholic brethren." It took until about 1675 for English settlers to reach what is now the DC area, after defeating the Powhatans that reduced the Native American numbers by roughly 90 percent.

Colonel Jehiel Brooks married into the land when he married Ann Margaret Queen, daughter of Nicholas Queen, and they received a 150-acre estate. In 1722, the Queen family raised a Roman Catholic church, which morphed into St. Francis de Sales Parish in 1908.

For most of the 19th century, the area was farmland owned by the prominent Middleton and Queen families. The Baltimore and Ohio Railroad later connected this portion of Washington County to downtown. Bellair, the 1840 brick Greek Revival mansion built by Colonel Jehiel Brooks, still stands. It is referred to as Brooks Mansion. It is the site of offices and production facilities for the Public Access Corporation of the District of Columbia, the city's Government-access television (GAVT) channel known as DCTV.

Change came rapidly during and after the American Civil War. First, Fort Slemmer and Fort Bunker Hill were constructed as defenses against the Confederate Army, and later the Old Soldiers' Home was constructed to the northwest. The population of the city itself increased with the expansion of the federal government, and the former Brooks family estate became a housing tract named "Brookland".

Growth continued throughout the 1870s when the Baltimore and Ohio Railroad opened its Western Branch Line in the developing Brookland neighborhood. With the construction of nearby Sherwood, University Heights, and other tracts and with the expansion of Washington's streetcar system, a middle-class streetcar suburb developed. Eventually its expansion southward met Washington's northward expansion. Many Queen Anne style and other Victorian homes still stand.

The transition from a country estate towards a residential development beginning in 1887 "marked the extension of suburban growth into the rather isolated reaches of the northeastern sector" of D.C. In its early days, the Brookland community was marked by "spacious lots and single family homes", which appealed to middle-class families and provided a "small town atmosphere".

== Education ==
- Archbishop Carroll High School
- Bunker Hill Elementary School
- Capital Village Public Charter School
- Catholic University of America
- Champions at Edgewood Elementary Campus
- DC Prep PCS Edgewood Elementary School
- DC Prep PCS Edgewood Middle Campus
- Elsie Whitlow Stokes Elementary School
- John Burroughs Elementary School - DC Public School
- Latin American Montessori Bilingual Public Charter School (LAMB)
- Lee Montessori Public Charter Schools
- The Sojourner Truth School
- St. Anthony Catholic School
- Saint Vincents Home and School for Girls
- Shining Stars Montessori Academy
- Washington Yu Ying PCS

== Landmarks ==
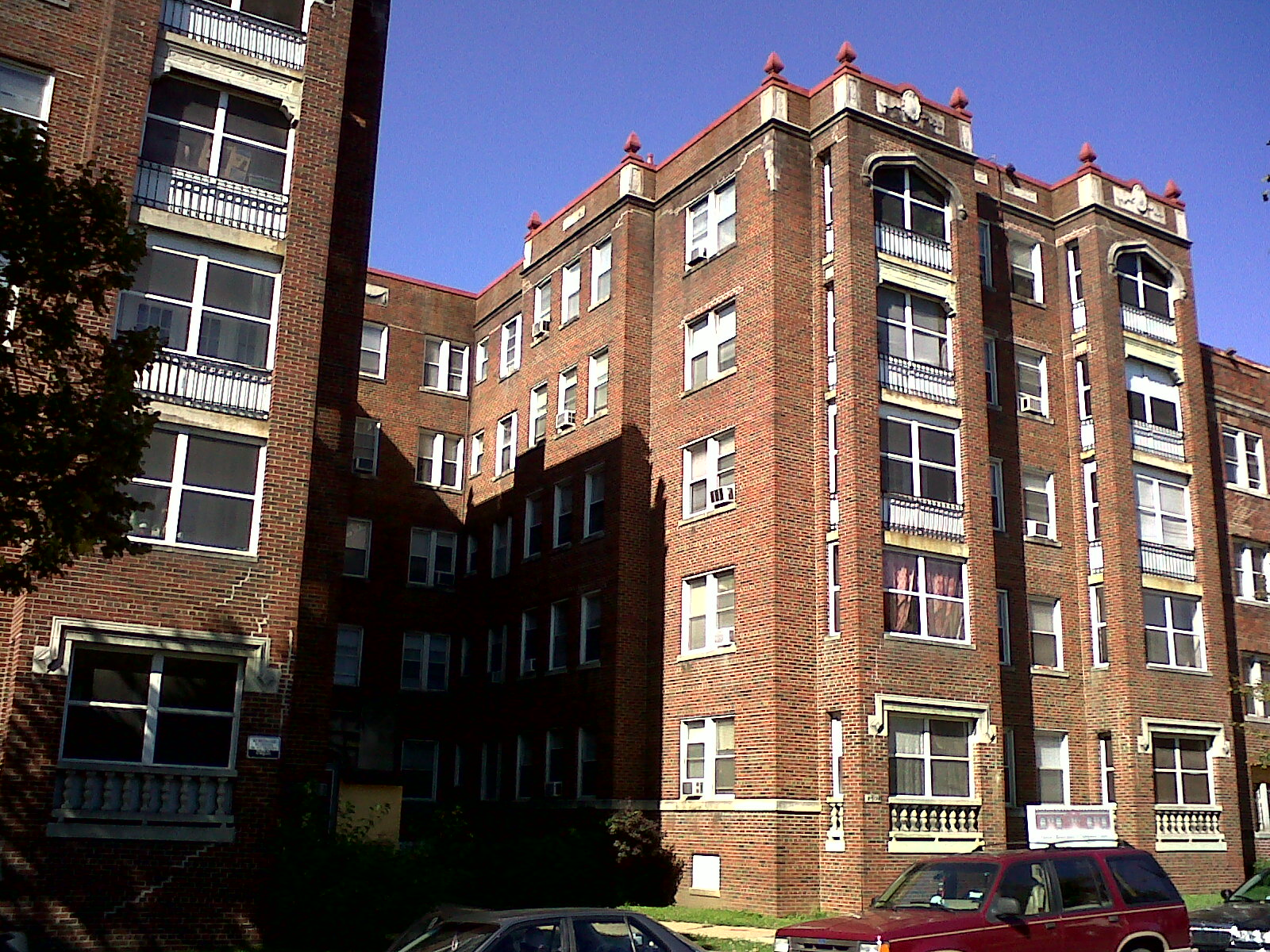
Dahlgreen Courts

- Fort Bunker Hill
- Newton Theater
- Dahlgreen Courts
- Brooks Mansion & DCTV (TV station)
- Ralph Bunche House
- Quincy House
- Charles Richard Drew Memorial Bridge
- Bunker Hill Elementary School
- Brookland Middle School
- Elsie Whitlow Stokes Public Charter School
- Shining Stars Montessori Public Charter School
- Luke C. Moore SHS
- Hope Community Public Charter School, Tolson Campus
- Mary McLeod Bethune Day Academy Public Charter School
- Franciscan Monastery and the St. Francis Hall
- Benjamin Mays Hall (formerly, College of the Holy Name)
- Turkey Thicket playground and recreation center
- St. Anthony's Catholic School & Church
- Archbishop Carroll High School
- King David Masonic Lodge
- The Round House

== Catholic institutions ==
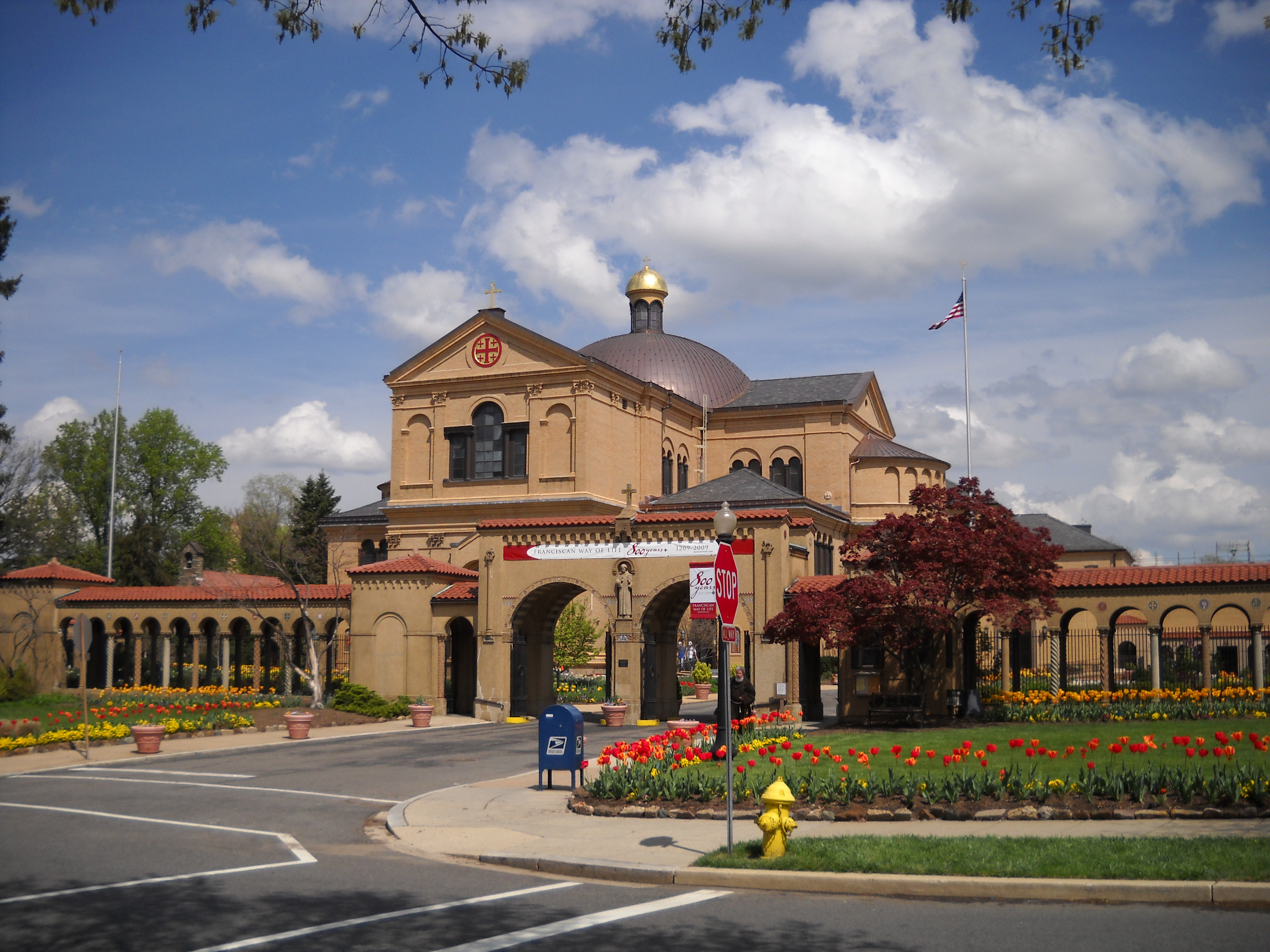
Franciscan Monastery of the Holy Land in America

Brookland, together with its surrounding neighborhoods, has been at times referred to as Little Rome and Little Vatican because of the many Catholic organizations and institutions clustered around the Catholic University of America. The university itself does not lie within Brookland's borders, but since the Catholic Church purchased the Middletown estate adjacent to Brookland in 1887, many Catholic groups have established themselves there and in the neighboring communities of Edgewood and Michigan Park. Ordered by year of establishment, major Catholic organizations that are physically located in Brookland include:

- Franciscan Monastery of the Holy Land in America (1899) and St. Francis Hall (1931)
- Holy Name College (1931–1984)
- Poor Clares of Perpetual Adoration Convent (1954–2017), Sisters of Life Convent (2017–present)
- Archdiocese for the Military Services, USA (1986)

From 1984 until 2015, the Franciscans’ Holy Name College had served as the Howard University School of Divinity's East Campus. As a divinity school, the institution did not solely focus on Christianity. Rather, it sought to educate students in scripture and theology generally, and to prepare them to be academics or to be ordained to serve as clergy. In 2016, the Urban Land Institute studied the site and engaged community stakeholders to determine potential development that might take place at the location. As of 2017, the site is scheduled to be redeveloped into a living-learning campus with current historic structures and open space preserved.

== Community diversity ==
Racial Makeup of the District of Columbia (2019)
1. White alone (42.5%)
2. Black alone (45.4%)
3. Native American alone (0.27%)
4. Asian alone (4.07%)
5. Pacific Islander alone (0.03%)
6. Some other race alone (4.37%)
7. Two or more races (3.30%)
Racial Makeup of the District of Columbia excluding Hispanics from racial categories (2019)
NH=Non-Hispanic
1. White NH (37.3%)
2. Black NH (44.1%)
3. Native American NH (0.24%)
4. Asian NH (4.02%)
5. Pacific Islander NH (0.01%)
6. Other race NH (0.34%)
7. Two or more races NH (2.69%)
8. Hispanic Any Race (11.3%)

Brookland integrated in the 20th century, especially after white flight took place following World War II and the US Supreme Court ruled in 1948 that restrictive covenants were unenforceable . Although there was some hostility directed at early black integration of the neighborhood, by the 1970s Brookland had developed into a neighborhood fairly integrated among economic classes and races.

During the mid-twentieth century, Brookland could boast of such prominent residents as Ralph Bunche, Sterling Allen Brown, Edward Brooke, Ellis O. Knox, Rayford W. Logan, Pearl Bailey, John P. Davis, Marvin Gaye, Paul Tsongas, Lucy Diggs Slowe, Lois Mailou Jones, and Robert C. Weaver. It remains a relatively diverse and stable area of Washington. African American architect Romulus C. Archer designed homes, buildings, and churches in the area.

Brookland was also home to the playwright Jean Kerr and her playwright/critic husband Walter Kerr, who taught at nearby Catholic University of America. The writer Marjorie Kinnan Rawlings spent her childhood in Brookland.

Justine Ward, the music educator and author, lived in Brookland and built the large residence now occupied by the Servants of the Lord and the Virgin of Matara in the 1300 block of Quincy Street. The Department of Music at Catholic University is housed in a building named in Ward's honor. Also on Quincy Street is the Quincy House, a long-time residence of Catholic graduate students who regularly host coffee houses and other community events.

== Development ==
In November 2011, D.C. based real estate developer Abdo broke ground on a large mixed-use development. The project, known as Monroe Street Market, was fully completed in 2014. This area includes 27 artists' studios on an "Arts Walk,". and commercial businesses and restaurants. While there are new projects slated for 2017/2018, at least part of the community believes the area is being overly developed, which has led to a few court battles with developers. A nearly-full-block parcel on Monroe Street between 9th and 10th Streets remains vacant at this time because of conflicts between neighbors and developers over the height of the planned mixed-use complex, meant to include over 200 apartments.

== See also ==
- Washington, D.C.
- Neighborhoods in Washington, D.C.
- History of Washington, D.C.
