= Hiram W. Johnson House =

Historic house in Washington, D.C., US

- U.S. National Register of Historic Places
- U.S. National Historic Landmark
- U.S. Historic district – Contributing property
- D.C. Inventory of Historic Sites
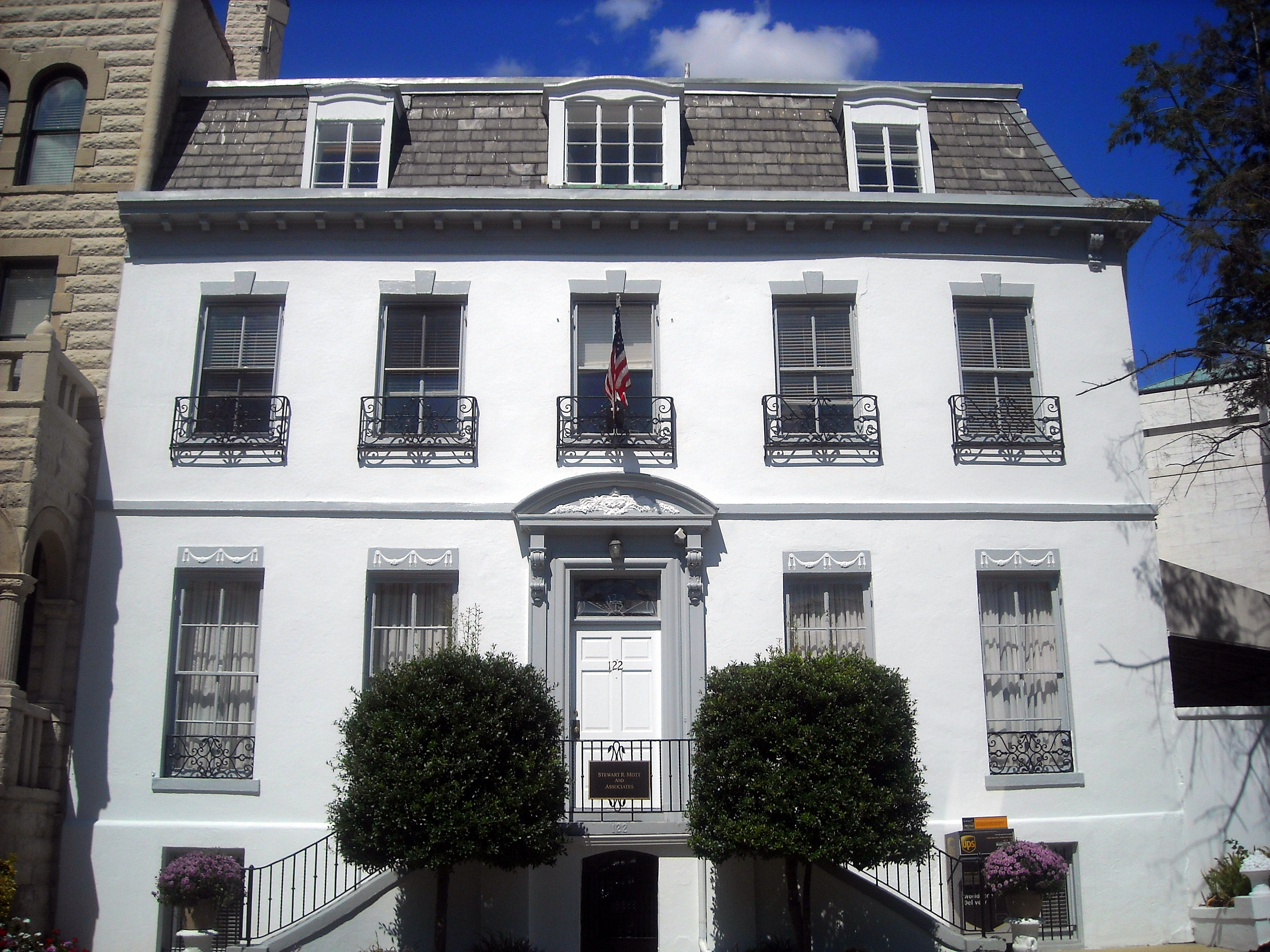

- Location within Washington, D.C.
- Location: 122 Maryland Ave., NE, Washington, D.C.
- Coordinates: 38°53′29″N 77°0′18″W
- Built: 1810
- Architectural style: Second Empire, Federal
- NRHP reference No.: 73002072

Significant dates
- Added to NRHP: July 20, 1973
- Designated NHL: December 8, 1976
- Designated DCIHS: November 8, 1964

The Hiram W. Johnson House, also known as Mountjoy Bayly House, Chaplains Memorial Building or Parkington, is an historic house at 122 Maryland Avenue, Northeast, Washington, D.C., in the Capitol Hill neighborhood. Built about 1822, it is most notable as the home of Hiram Johnson (1866–1945), a prominent force in the Progressive Party of the early 20th century and its vice presidential candidate under Theodore Roosevelt in the 1912 election. It was declared a National Historic Landmark in 1976, and contributing property to the Capitol Hill Historic District.

== History ==
The Hiram W. Johnson House is located on Capitol Hill, occupying a parcel bounded on the north by Constitution Avenue and the south by Maryland Avenue. It is just north of the United States Supreme Court and south of the Hart Senate Office Building, and is oriented facing south toward Maryland Avenue. It is a 2 1/2-story brick building (painted white), with a raised basement and a mansard roof providing a full third floor. Its main facade is five bays wide, with a center entrance accessed via side-facing stairs. The entrance surround has pilasters rising to a bracketed segmental-arch pediment. First-floor windows are elongated, and topped by headers decorated with swags. Second-floor windows are topped by splayed lintels with keystones, and have shallow wrought iron balconies.

The house was built sometime after the War of 1812 in a Federal style, and was later given its present Second Empire treatment. It was the residence of the second Sergeant at Arms of the Senate, General Mountjoy Bayly, an officer of the Maryland Line during the Revolutionary War and an original member of The Society of the Cincinnati in the state of Maryland. From 1899 to 1924 it was home to an appellate court judge, and it was briefly owned by a band of the Schwarzenau Brethren before it was purchased in 1929 by Hiram Johnson. Owners or occupants since then have included the American Civil Liberties Union and the Democratic Senatorial Campaign Committee.

Johnson was a politician from California, and a leading voice of progressivism and reform in the Republican Party for many years. He served as Governor of California, implementing a sweeping progressive agenda, and was a founder of the Progressive Party that contested the 1912 election with Johnson as its vice presidential candidate. In the 1930s Johnson supported the Democratic New Deal programs. He was also a maverick on foreign policy, steadfastly taking isolationist positions before and after both world wars.

== See also ==
- List of National Historic Landmarks in Washington, D.C.
- National Register of Historic Places listings in Northeast Quadrant, Washington, D.C.
