= Old Engine Company 26 (Washington, D.C.) =

- Engine Company 26, (Old)
- U.S. National Register of Historic Places
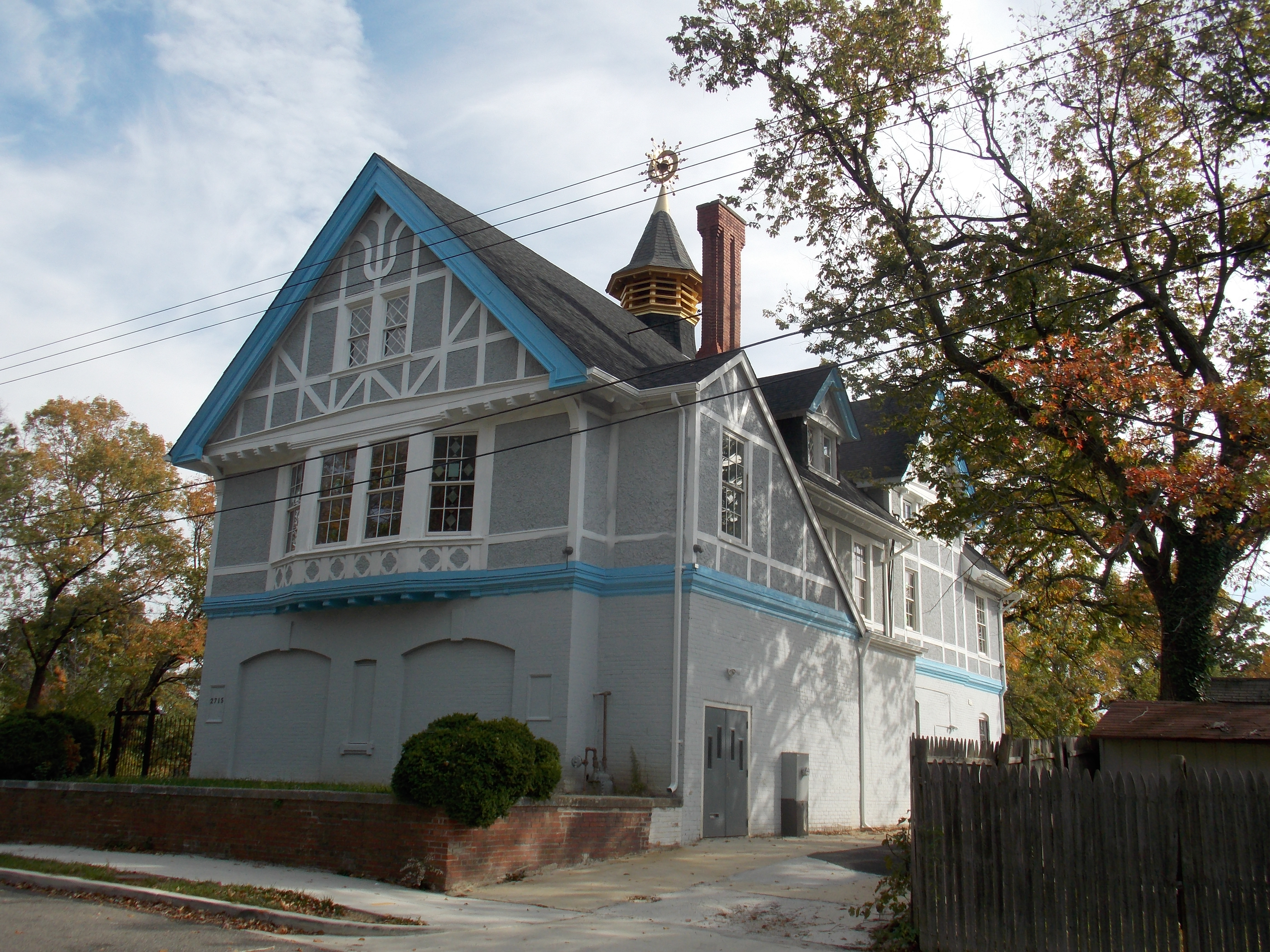
- Old Engine Company 26 building in 2014

- Location within District of Columbia
- Location: 2715 22nd St. NE; Washington, D.C.
- Coordinates: 38°55′30″N 76°58′26″W
- Area: less than one acre
- Built: 1908
- Built by: Mullett, A.B., & Sons
- Architectural style: Tudor Revival
- MPS: Firehouses in Washington DC MPS
- NRHP reference No.: 07000536
- Added to NRHP: August 8, 2007

Old Engine Company No. 26, also known as the Langdon Firehouse and Chemical Company No. 3, located at 2715 22nd Street, NE, Washington, D.C. is a historic firehouse built in 1908 and listed on the National Register of Historic Places in 2007.

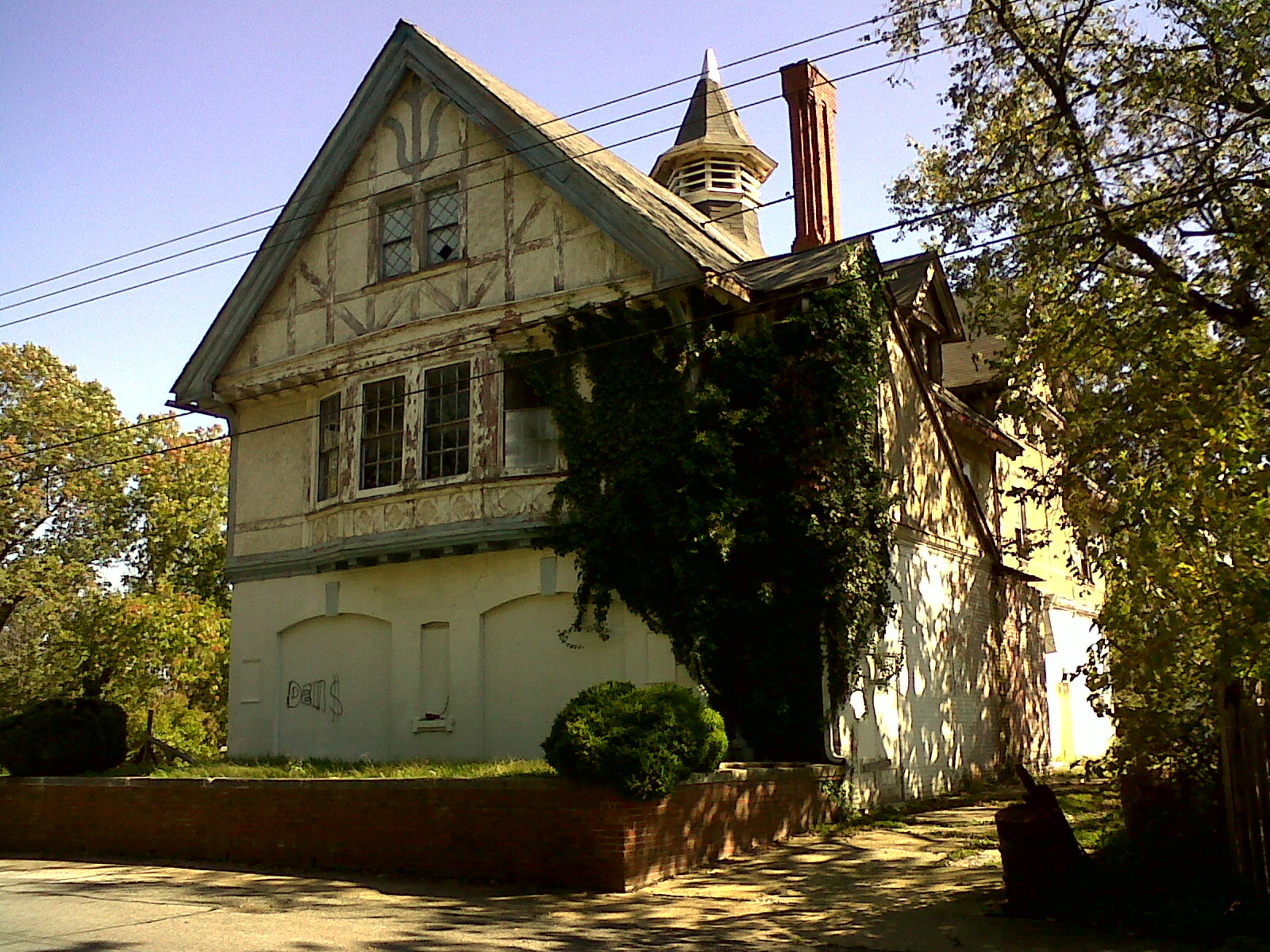
Old Engine Co 26 before it was renovated as a church

The firehouse was built in response to a petition by the Northeastern Citizens’ Suburban Association for better fire protection. The Langdon neighborhood where it is located lay outside Washington's hydrant system, so fires were extinguished with chemicals and the station was originally known as Chemical Company No. 3. The station was renamed Engine Company 26 in the 1920s and closed in 1940.

Originally built to house Chemical Company 3, the firehouse was renamed Engine Company 26 in 1913. In 1940, a year after a major restructuring of the fire department, Engine Company 26 moved in with Truck Company 15 at 1340 Rhode Island Avenue, N.E. The city then proposed to adapt the building for use as a library. The Rhode Island Avenue Citizens’ Association countered the proposal with one to use the firehouse as a community center. The city decided, instead, to sell the building to the highest bidder. Shortly thereafter, the building was purchased by a church. It was later resold to the New Memorial Temple of Christ Apostolic Faith, Inc., which currently occupies the property.
