= National Register of Historic Places listings in Washington, D.C. =

This is a list of properties and districts in Washington, D.C., on the National Register of Historic Places. There are more than 600 listings, including 74 National Historic Landmarks of the United States and another 13 places otherwise designated as historic sites of national importance by Congress or the President.

The locations of National Register properties and districts (at least for all showing latitude and longitude coordinates below), may be seen in an online map by clicking on "Map of all coordinates".

The list is generally grouped by quadrant. The Northwest Quadrant has more than 400 listings, so it is further divided into three parts. The part of the NW Quadrant nearest the National Mall (east of Rock Creek and south of M Street) is grouped with the Southwest quadrant and called "central Washington" for the purposes of this list. The remaining sections are of the NW Quadrant are divided between areas east of Rock Creek and areas to its west. The following are approximate tallies of current listings by area.

The White House, the Capitol, and the United States Supreme Court Building are recorded in the National Register's NRIS database as National Historic Landmarks, but by the provisions of the Historic Preservation Act of 1966, Section 107 (16 U.S.C. 470g), these three buildings and associated buildings and grounds are legally exempted from listing in the National Register.

This National Park Service list is complete through NPS recent listings posted August 7, 2026.

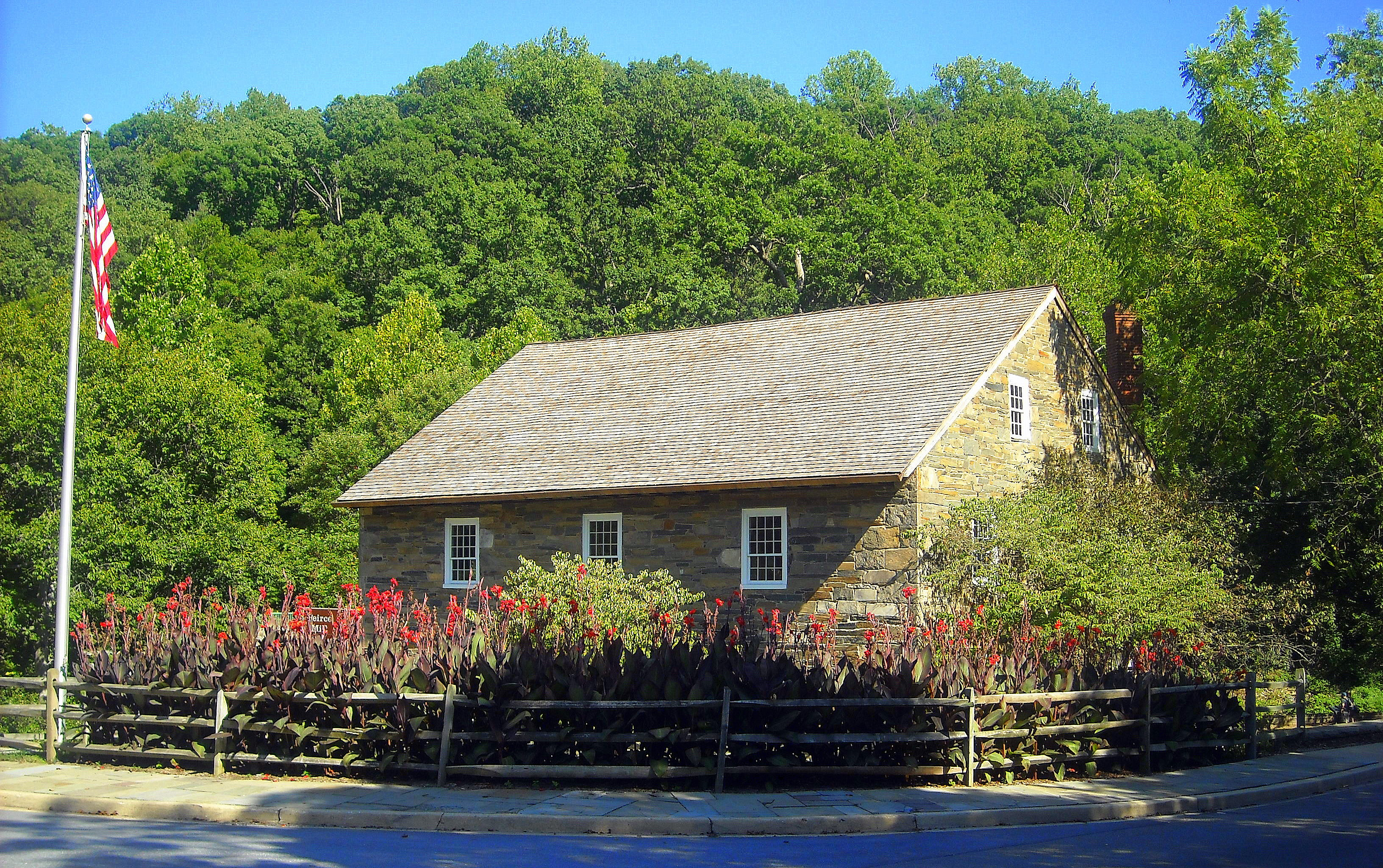
Peirce Mill, in Northwest quadrant

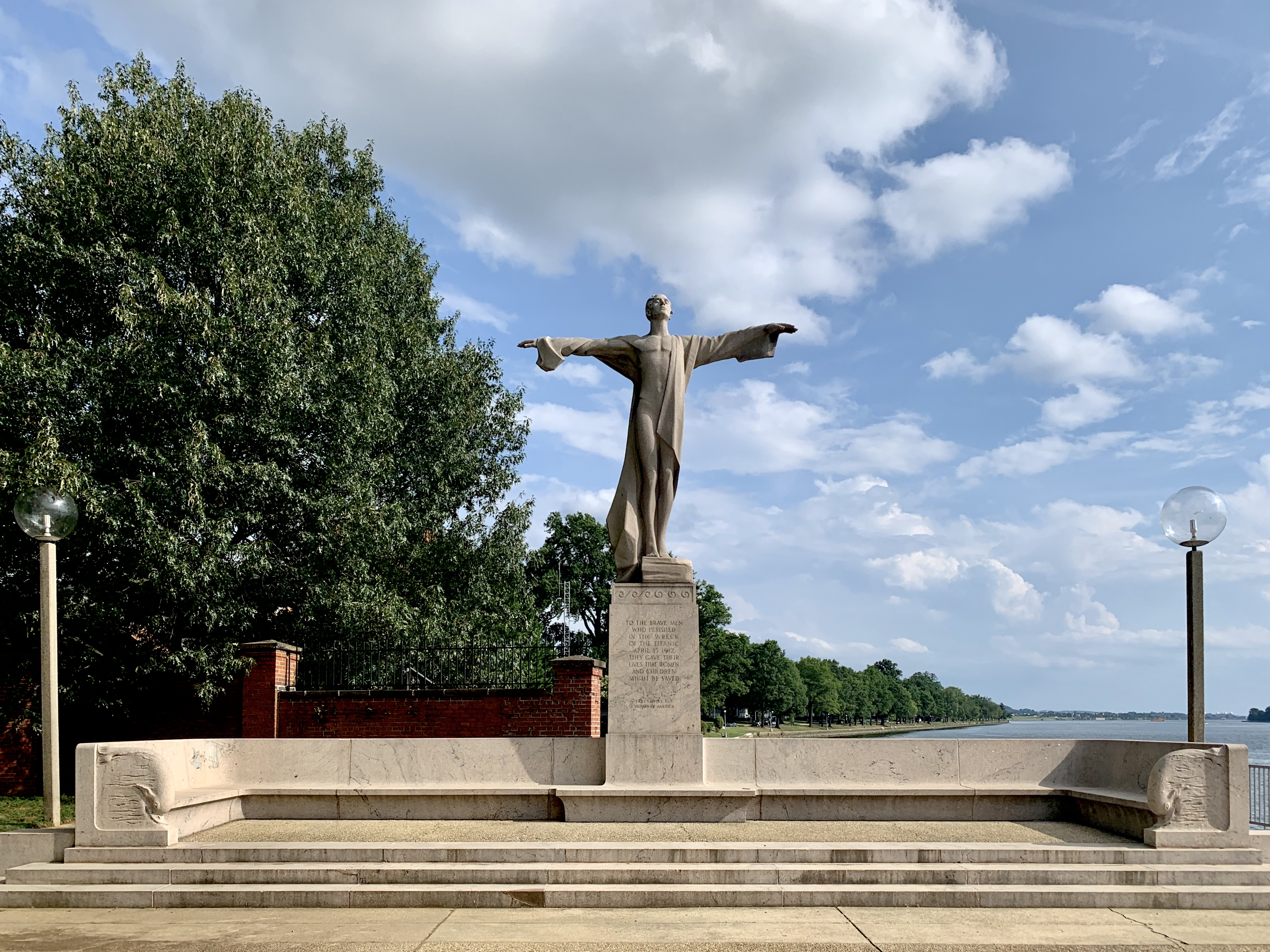
Titanic Memorial, Southwest quadrant

	Area	# of Sites
1	Central	226
2	Western NW Quadrant	137
3	Upper NW Quadrant	228
4	Northeast	72
5	Southeast	44
6	Duplicates	(19)
Total:		688

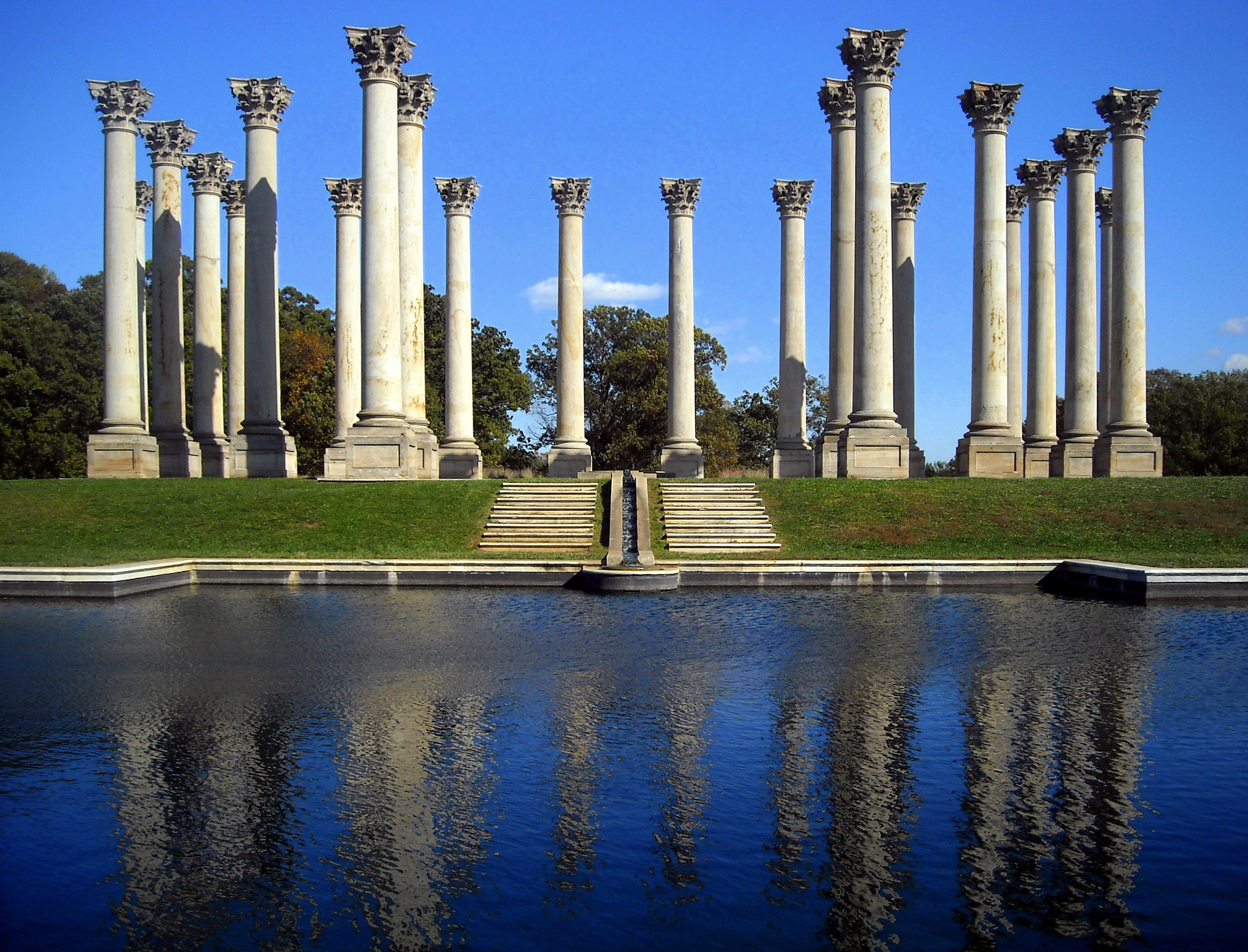
U.S. National Arboretum, in Northeast quadrant

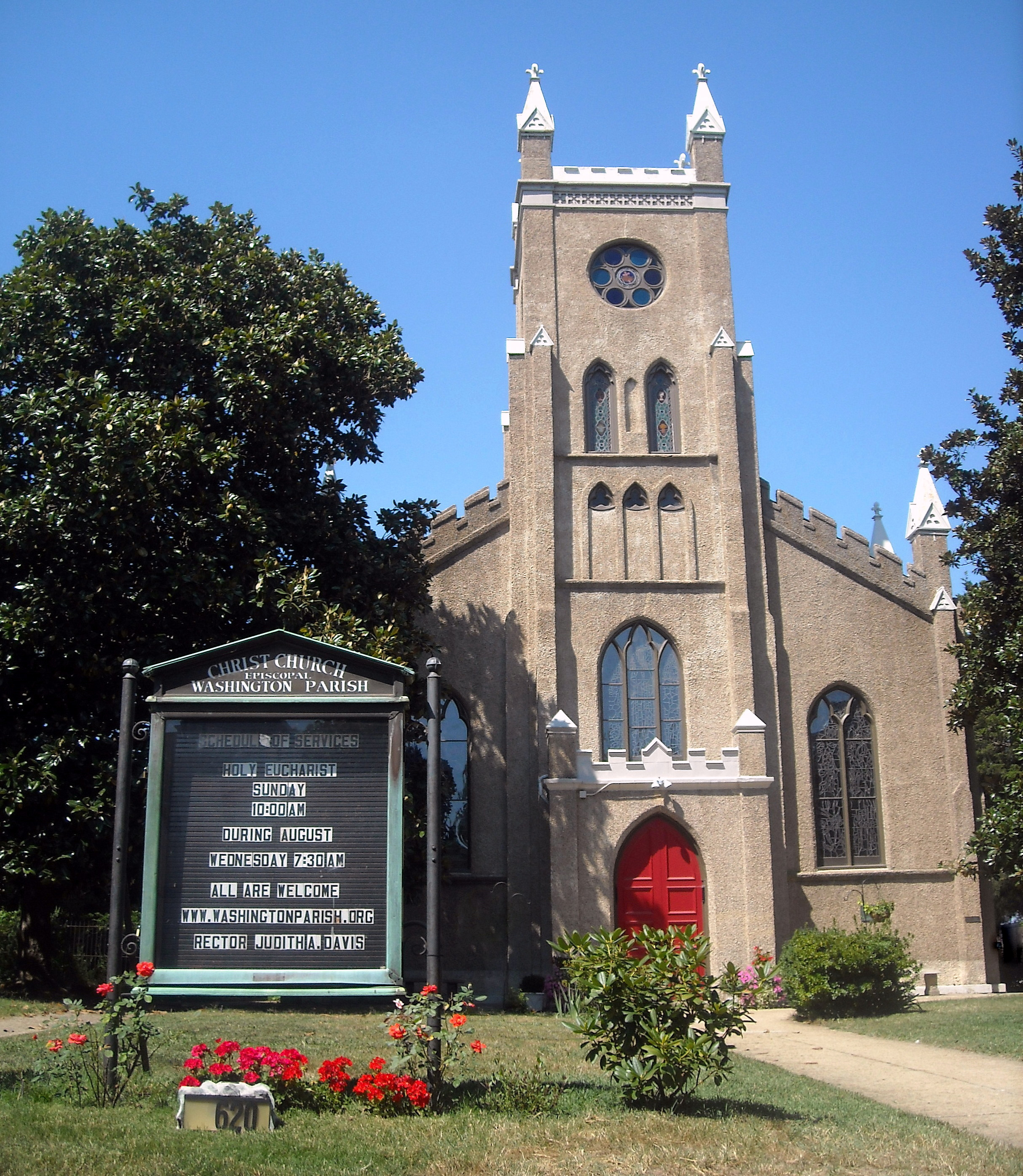
Christ Church, Washington Parish, in Southeast quadrant

== See also ==
- List of National Historic Landmarks in the District of Columbia
- District of Columbia Inventory of Historic Sites
- History of Washington, D.C.
- Timeline of Washington, D.C.
- Architecture of Washington, D.C.
