= Edward Gero =

American actor

Edward Gero is an American stage actor active primarily in the Washington, DC area, acclaimed for his performances in Shakespeare and other classical plays.

== Early life and career ==
Gero, an Italian-American, was raised in Madison, New Jersey; his mother was a housemaid and his father a union president. Gero decided on a career in acting after seeing a production of Hamlet starring Stacy Keach in New York’s Delacorte amphitheater as a teenager. After his education at Montclair State University, Gero began playing small roles at Classic Stage Company, an off-Broadway theater in New York, and later was invited to play a full season at the Barter Theatre in Abingdon, Virginia. By 1983 he was appearing in productions at the Shakespeare Theatre in Washington, D.C., where he remains a fixture to this day. He has appeared in seventy productions there, including roles in all the major works of Shakespeare as well as plays by Molière and Chekhov. Gero has branched out into non-classical plays as well, appearing to great acclaim as President Richard Nixon in the two-man play Nixon’s Nixon at Roundhouse Theatre in Bethesda, Maryland. In November 2009 Gero made his debut at Ford’s Theatre, playing the role of Ebeneezer Scrooge in the company’s annual version of Dickens’ A Christmas Carol. Gero has done voice-over work for documentaries on the Discovery Channel and PBS. He is an associate professor of drama and Performance Area Head in the School of Theater at George Mason University, and also teaches for the University of Maryland and George Washington University. Gero has won four Helen Hayes awards: in 1989 (for Macbeth), 1994 (for Richard II), 1995 (for Henry IV), and 1998 (for Skylight). He played Mark Rothko in John Logan's Red at the Goodman Theatre in Chicago and at Arena Stage in Washington, D.C. In 2015, Gero played Supreme Court Associate Justice Antonin Scalia in John Strand's The Originalist, also at Arena Stage. He is married to Marijke Ebbinge, a former Ford model. Their son, Christian, is a sound designer and audio engineer.

== Performance ==
His Scalia role was first performed in Washington DC in 2015 and The New York Times gave it a positive review stating: "Mr. Gero’s portrayal is a more reflective version of Justice Scalia than the one the public sees. It is also more sympathetic than many might expect." The play is set for stage production to start performances at the Pasadena Playhouse in California on April 11, 2017.

== Filmography ==
Year	Title	Role	Notes
1990	Die Hard 2	Engineer #5	
1993	Striking Distance	Officer Lulley	
