= The Originalist =

Play about the US Supreme Court

- Cover of the script as published by Dramatists Play Service
- Original language: English
- Written by: John Strand
- Characters: Justice Antonin Scalia
- Subject: A fictionalized depiction of the Supreme Court Justice
- Genre: Drama
- Setting: Judges' chambers at SCOTUS

Premiere
- Date: 2015
- Place: Arena Stage, Washington, D.C.

The Originalist is a 2015 play that depicts the relationship between Antonin Scalia, at the time an associate justice of the Supreme Court of the United States, and a fictional Supreme Court law clerk whose views differ from his. Written by John Strand, the play was originally produced for stage performance in Washington, DC in 2015 under director Molly Smith; actor Edward Gero portrayed Scalia. The play received a positive review in The New York Times and has been produced at multiple theaters. In March 2017, the play was broadcast on public television.

== Background ==
In 2015, Antonin Scalia was an associate justice of the Supreme Court of the United States. A polarizing figure in American politics, he advocated interpreting the constitution of the United States through originalism and statutory law through textualism and was himself often considered conservative. Every term, each justice of the court hires four law clerks who assist the justice by reviewing petitions for certiorari, researching case law, and writing memos and opinion drafts. Hiring criteria are idiosyncratic to each justice. Scalia occasionally hired someone inclined to social liberalism as one of his four clerks for a term as a "counter-clerk" whose "predispositions are quite the opposite of mine" and would "make sure I don't make mistakes", in his words.

== Plot ==
Antonin Scalia is entering a new term of the Supreme Court and reviewing applications for law clerks to serve in his office during the coming year. One of the applications he receives is from Cat, a recent woman graduate from law school who wishes to be his law clerk and who also has firmly held liberal beliefs. Scalia is intrigued and invites her for an interview. The interview leads to heated exchanges in which the potential law clerk makes strong assertions about her liberal beliefs and claims that these convictions do not mean she is unqualified to be a clerk for a conservative Justice of the Court. When Scalia protests, Cat states that she thinks she and Scalia actually have a lot in common, such as being Roman Catholic and graduating from Harvard Law School. After some further verbal sparring, Scalia agrees to take her on as his law clerk and as someone capable of making reasoned arguments on positions which do not necessarily align completely with his own.

Soon after she becomes his clerk, legal blogs begin reporting personal details of Scalia's new law clerk and details of her personal life. She feels compelled to present these to Scalia prior to them being made public in the press and causing possible embarrassment to Scalia in that way. She admits to being part of the LGBT movement and that she is involved in an LGBT relationship. Rather than becoming angry, Scalia indicates that he is better-informed than she may have thought and that he had received a preliminary report of this matter through a background check during her application process. He says that her private life is not the media's business or his, and she continues as his legal clerk.

While clerking for Scalia she has further confrontations with both Scalia and his other highly conservative law clerk. At one point, Scalia requires her to join him at a shooting range, and he teaches her to shoot a rifle. Unexpectedly, the two are able to debate issues of the Court further in a manner suggesting that Scalia is more open-minded than often-stated opinions of him as an arch-conservative. Their mutual animosity and differences of opinion begin to shift considerably when Scalia appears to suffer from heart palpitations, and she quickly comes to his side to assist him as best she can. Later, when her own father appears to become mortally ill and on his death bed, Scalia offers his own sympathy for her imminent loss. The play ends with the two of them reconciling to the fact that both their differences and their similarities appear to signify more than the direct review of the cases coming before the Court in the particular year when she is one of his law clerks.

== Production ==
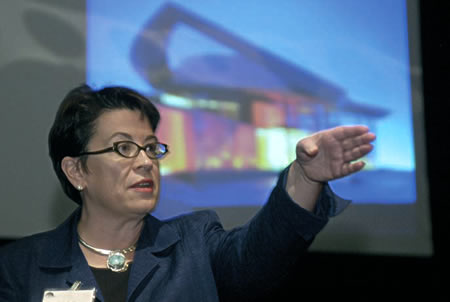
Molly Smith in 2007

The play was first performed at the Arena Stage in Washington, DC in 2015, directed by Molly Smith. Lead actor Edward Gero met with Scalia and observed him during a Supreme Court oral argument before portraying him onstage. The play began its stage production at the Pasadena Playhouse in California on April 11, 2017.

From July 19 to August 19, 2018, the play was performed at the 59E59 Theaters in New York City, with Gero continuing in the lead role and Tracy Ifeachor as the fictional law clerk. Following the performance of July 29, 2018, Justice Ruth Bader Ginsburg participated in a conversation on stage with the play's director, Smith.

== Public television ==
In March 2017, an onstage performance of The Originalist was broadcast three times on PBS' Theater Close-Up.

== Reception ==
The play received a generally positive reception. The New York Times gave the play's 2015 run a positive review and stated that "Gero's portrayal is a more reflective version of Justice Scalia than the one the public sees. It is also more sympathetic than many might expect." According to Above the Law, the "strongest reason to see the play is Edward Gero’s remarkable performance". A correspondent for The Atlantic complimented Gero's "eerily convincing physical impersonation" of Scalia and the script's "clever lines". The Washington Post considered the play "alive with new writing", stating that Gero's performance "makes you believe this tantalizing man knows and feels American law down to his very bones", but argued that the script makes Scalia "he is more believable than" the clerk character, Cat, such that the Post recommended that Strand and Smith "temper the characterization a little" to make her more "believable". According to the New York University Journal of Law & Liberty, The Originalist depicts Cat as counter-clerk as a "ceaseless sparring partner" who advocates living constitutionalism; in reality, however, Scalia's counter-clerks typically were not tasked with convincing him originalism was wrong but instead had the responsibility to "help assure that he was the best, truest, most straight-shooting originalist and textualist he could be", in the words of one of his former clerks.

In a review of a 2018 run at Court Theatre, NewCity Stage criticized The Originalist's premise, arguing that it implicitly "attempts to vindicate Scalia’s impact on American law by arguing he was a pretty nice guy", but complimented the production as "expertly acted and beautifully produced".

== See also ==
- Scalia/Ginsburg

== Bibliography ==
- Baum, Lawrence; Ditslear, Corey (2010). "Supreme Court Clerkships and 'Feeder' Judges". Justice System Journal. 31 (1): 26–48. doi:10.1080/0098261X.2010.10767953 (inactive July 1, 2025).
- Miller, Mark C. (Summer 2014). "Law Clerks and Their Influence at the US Supreme Court: Comments on Recent Works by Peppers and Ward". Law and Social Inquiry. 39 (3): 741–757. doi:10.1111/lsi.12074. JSTOR 24545677.
- Samuel, Ian (2016). "The Counter-clerks of Justice Scalia". New York University Journal of Law & Liberty. 10 (1): 1–17.
