= Mary Hall Surface =

American theatre director, playwright, and teaching artist (born 1958)

- Surface in 2015
- Born: June 15, 1958 (age 68); Bowling Green, Kentucky, U.S.
- Education: Centre College
- Occupations: Theater Director, Playwright, Teaching Artist
- Years active: 1982–present
- Spouse: Kevin Reese (m. 1987)
- Children: Malinda Kathleen Reese
- Website: maryhallsurface.com

Mary Hall Surface (born June 15, 1958) is an American theatre director, playwright, and teaching artist. Based in Washington, DC, her work focuses on theatre productions for family audiences and writing inspired by art.

In 2022, Surface received the Orlin Corey Medallion Award from the Children's Theatre Foundation of America." Surface has been nominated for 10 Helen Hayes Awards and received the 2002 Helen Hayes Award for Outstanding Direction of a musical for her production of Perseus Bayou.

In her approach as a creative writing teacher and mentor, Surface uses visual art in the writing process. As described in a Washington Post feature about her work at the National Gallery of Art, "Surface searches for a powerful link between a work of art and an aspect of writing."

== Career ==
Surface moved to California in 1982 and served as the associate director of the California Theatre Center (CTC) from 1982 to 1988. She wrote her first plays for and with the acting company of CTC, including Prodigy, Blessings and Most Valuable Player, a play about Jackie Robinson.

In 1989, Surface moved to Washington, DC, to write and direct for the John F. Kennedy Center's first season of Theatre for Young Audiences. She has since written and/or directed productions for both young and adult audiences at numerous Washington theaters including Arena Stage, Round House Theatre, Folger Theatre, and Constellation Theatre, and has had nineteen productions at the Kennedy Center. Surface is the founding Artistic Director (2009–2015) of the Atlas INTERSECTIONS Festival, an all-arts festival.

Surface has also created interactive performances for very young children, with a program of plays for infants and preschool aged toddlers called Theatre for the Very Young.

Female characters center prominently in Surface's work. She was commissioned by Arena Stage to write a monologue for My Body, No Choice (2022) and she directed She Persisted (a musical by Adam Tobin and Deborah Wicks La Puma, based on the book by Chelsea Clinton) for Adventure Theatre MTC in 2024.

=== Surface-Maddox collaborations ===
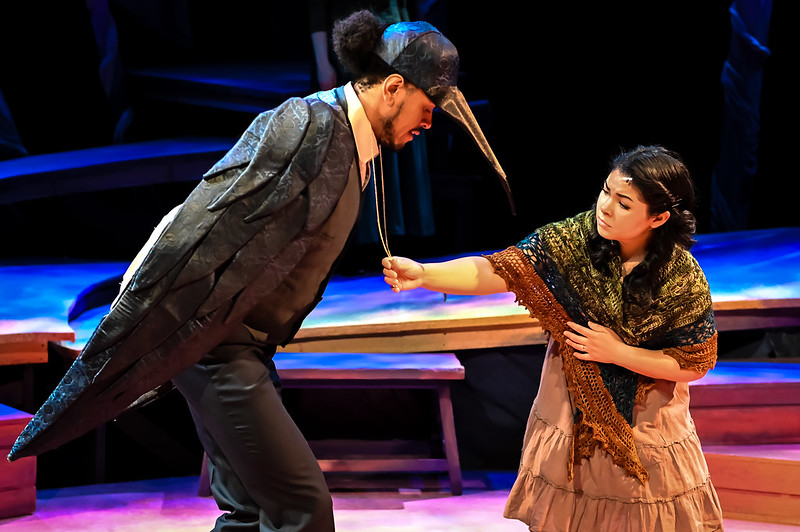
"Sing Down the Moon: Appalachian Wonder Tales," Adventure Theatre MTC, 2024.

Surface's 1997 Kennedy Center commission and three-time national touring production of The Nightingale, a dance-theater piece created with choreographer Dana Tai Soon Burgess, launched her 10-year collaboration with composer David Maddox. Together, Surface and Maddox created five music-theater works commissioned by Theater of the First Amendment (TFA), George Mason University's professional theater from 1990 to 2012. These collaborative productions included:

- Sing Down the Moon: Appalachian Wonder Tales
- Perseus Bayou: The Search for the Cajun Medusa
- Mississippi Pinocchio
- The Odyssey of Telémeca
- Lift: Icarus and Me

Four of these shows were nominated for the Charles MacArthur Award for Best New Play. Surface received the 2002 Helen Hayes Award for Outstanding Director of a Musical for Perseus Bayou.

=== Plays ===
Surface has been commissioned by the National Gallery of Art in Washington, DC, to write, direct, and produce four plays for family audiences inspired by visual art:

- Who's in the Hopper, inspired by the work of Edward Hopper
- Framed, inspired by the work of Roy Lichtenstein
- Forward 54th, Inspired by August St. Gaudens Shaw Memorial
- Color's Garden: An Adventure with the Elements of Art, inspired by the cut-outs of Henri Matisse

Surface explains that these plays were created to "engage the public in a very emotional and lively, personal way in the art." Inspired by the artists' lives and methods, these plays are not biographies. They are independent theatrical experiences that illuminate the spirit of the visual artists' work.

=== Writing salons ===
Surface then became the founding instructor of the National Gallery of Art's Writing Salon, a public program from 2014 to 2020 that approaches art as an inspiration for writing and writing as a way to deepen connection to visual art.

In a 2018 article for the Journal of Museum Education, Surface and article co-author Nathalie Ryan share the pedagogical approach of the program.

=== Workshops ===
Surface now leads a series, "Write into Art," as well as reflective writing workshops inspired by art through the Smithsonian Associates. She also has presented art-inspired writing workshops through the Washington National Cathedral and the Chautauqua Institute. She also facilitates Writers' Studios in the US and Europe.

Surface designs each art-based writing workshop to pair a specific type of writing with a specific work of art, such as using landscapes to explore setting or portraits to explore character.

== Honors and awards ==
Year	Award	Work
2022	Orlin Corey Medallion Award	Awarded for significant achievements for the enrichment of children in the United States and Canada through nurturing artistic work in theatre and the arts, Children's Theatre Foundation of America
2019, 2009, 1995	Individual Artist Fellowships, D.C. Commission for the Arts and Humanities	Awarded to support artists whose work and artistic excellence significantly contributes to the District of Columbia as a world-class cultural capital
2017–18	Playwrights Arena, Arena Stage	Selected to participate in Cohort Three to investigate artistic process and advance dramaturgical practice, Washington, DC
2006	Charlotte Chorpenning Award	Recognized for a body of work as a nationally known writer of outstanding plays for children, American Alliance for Theatre and Education
2002	Helen Hayes Award	Outstanding Director, Resident Musical, Perseus Bayou, Theatre of the First Amendment, Fairfax, VA

=== Helen Hayes awards ===
Year	Award	Work	Result
1993	Outstanding Director, Resident Musical	Tintypes, Round House Theatre	Nomination
2000	Outstanding Director, Resident Musical	Grimm Tales,	Nomination
2001	The Charles MacArthur Award for Outstanding New Play	Sing Down the Moon, Appalachian Wonder Tales,	Nomination
2001	Outstanding Director, Resident Musical	Sing Down the Moon, Appalachian Wonder Tales	Nomination
2002	The Charles MacArthur Award for Outstanding New Play	Perseus Bayou	Nomination
2002	Outstanding Director, Resident Musical	Perseus Bayou	Winner
2003	The Charles MacArthur Award for Outstanding New Musical	Mississippi Pinocchio	Nomination
2007	The Charles MacArthur Award for Outstanding New Play or Musical	Lift: Icarus and Me	Nomination
2009	Outstanding Director, Resident Musical	Goodnight Moon	Nomination
2025	Outstanding Director, Resident Musical (Helen)	She Persisted	Nomination

== Other selected productions ==
- Tales of Custard the Dragon, music by Brad Ross, Lyrics by Danny Whitman, Book by Mary Hall Surface. Directed by Mary Hall Surface, 2002, National Symphony Orchestra, Kennedy Center, Washington, DC.
- A Perfect Balance, a solo multi-media performance piece, inspired by the work of artist Alexander Calder, written and directed by Mary Hall Surface, designed and performed by Kevin Reese, presented over 1500 times throughout the US and in France and Taiwan, 1991–2018.
- The Second Shepherds' Play, adapted and directed by Mary Hall Surface, 2007 & 2016, Folger Consort, Folger Shakespeare Library, Washington, DC.
- The Skin of Our Teeth, by Thornton Wilder, directed by Mary Hall Surface, 2018, Constellation Theatre Company, Washington, DC. Named among top 10 regional theatre productions in 2018 by Terry Teachout, Wall Street Journal.
- Young People's Concert, written and directed by Mary Hall Surface, 2018, National Symphony Orchestra, Kennedy Center, Washington, DC.

== Recordings ==
- "The Nightingale" (1999) – playwright with composer David Maddox.
- "Sing Down The Moon: Appalachian Wonder Tales" (2002) – playwright with composer David Maddox.
- "Perseus Bayou: The Search for the Cajun Medusa" (2002) – playwright with composer David Maddox.
- "The Odyssey of Telémaca" (2004) – playwright with composer David Maddox.

=== Books ===
- "Wolfgang Amadeus Mozart" (1988) – author. Published by Dramatic Publishing.
- "The Sorcerer's Apprentice" (1994) – author. Published by Dramatic Publishing.
- Most Valuable Player and Four Other All-Star Plays for Middle and High School Audiences (Young Actors Series)" (1999) – author. Published by Smith & Kraus.
- "Short Scenes and Monologues for Middle School Actors" (2000) – author. Published by Smith & Kraus.
- "More Short Scenes and Monologues for Middle School Students: Inspired by Literature, Social Studies, and Real Life (Young Actor Series)" (2007) – author. Published by Smith & Kraus.
- "Spirit Shall Fly" (2007) – author. Published by Dramatic Publishing.
- "The Tales of the Custard Dragon" (2009) – co-author with Danny Whitman. Published by Concord Theatricals.
- "Dancing Solo" (1991) – author. Published by Dramatic Publishing.
- "The Reluctant Dragon" (1990) – author. Published by Dramatic Publishing.

== Personal life ==
On December 12, 1987, Surface married actor and sculptor, Kevin Reese. They have one daughter, American YouTuber, singer-songwriter, actor, and filmmaker, Malinda Kathleen Reese.
