= Malinda Kathleen Reese =

American internet personality, singer-songwriter and stage actress (born 1994)

Malinda
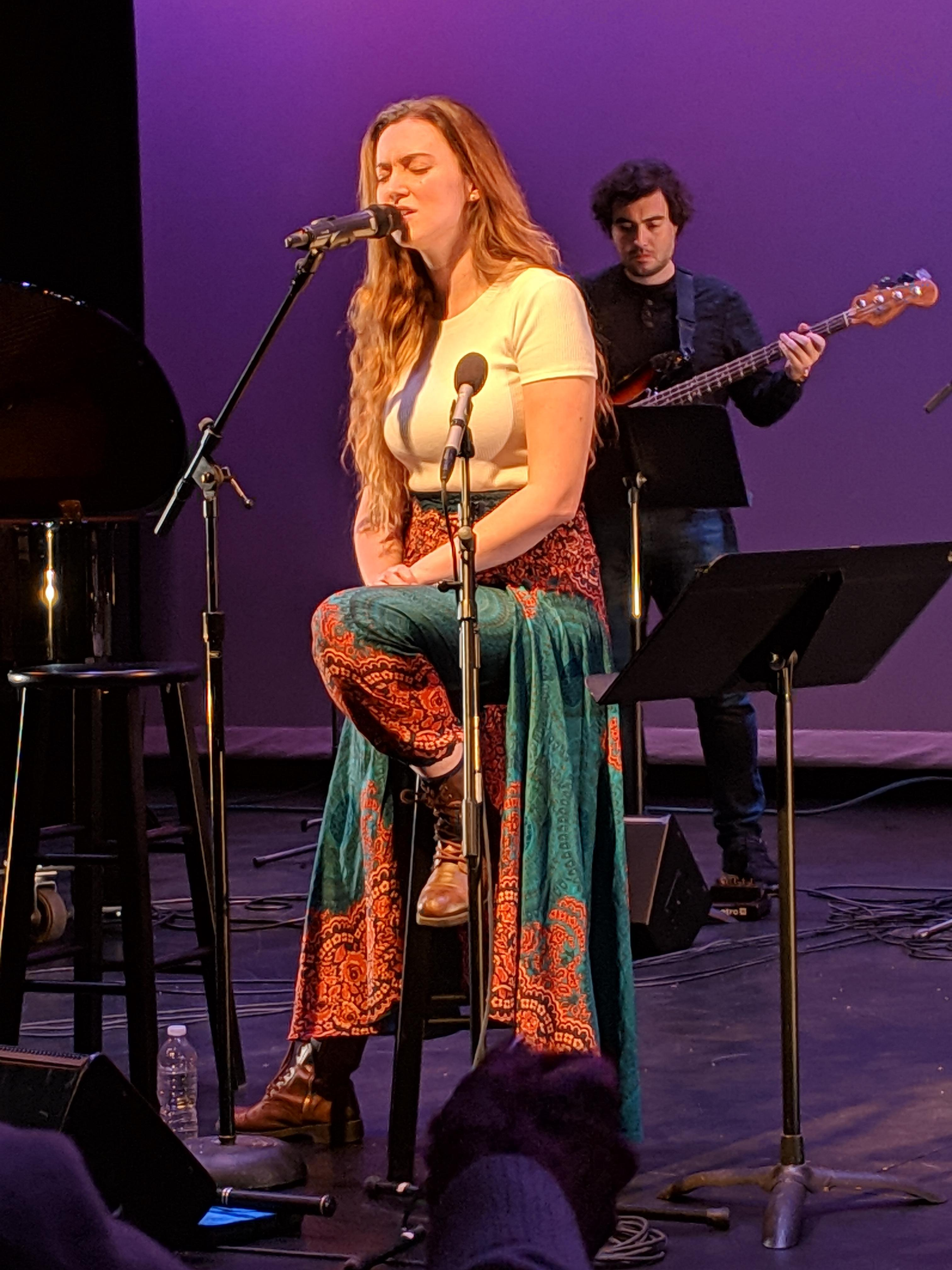
- Malinda in 2020
- Born: Malinda Kathleen Reese; June 27, 1994 (age 32); Washington, D.C., U.S.
- Education: Vassar College
- Occupations: Singer-songwriter; YouTuber; Instrumentalist; Actress; TikToker
- Mother: Mary Hall Surface

YouTube information
- Channels: MALINDA; Twisted Translations
- Years active: 2014–2022, 2024 (Twisted Translations); 2018–present (MALINDA)
- Subscribers: 1.77 million (MALINDA); 1.18 million (Twisted Translations)
- Views: 321 million (MALINDA); 254 million (Twisted Translations)
- Musical career
- Genres: Pop, Folk
- Years active: 2016–present
- Last updated: February 20, 2026

Malinda Kathleen Reese (born June 27, 1994), known professionally as Malinda (stylized in all caps), is an American internet personality, singer-songwriter and stage actress. She is best known for her Irish music covers on TikTok and her channel Twisted Translations on YouTube, on which she performed songs and performances from song lyrics and other texts that have been translated through multiple languages and back into English using Google Translate, Currently, she releases original music and vlogs on her main channel. Her debut is a 2018 EP, Love Letter. In addition, she has performed in numerous theatre plays in the Washington, D.C., area, including playing Girl in the musical Once, for which she won a Helen Hayes Award in 2020.

== Early life and education ==
Reese was born on June 27, 1994, and raised in Washington, D.C. She is the only child of Mary Hall Surface, a teacher and playwright, and Kevin Reese, an actor. She recalls spending much of her youth backstage during theater performances, and spending time in costume shops. As a teenager, she went to Interlochen Arts Camp in Michigan and Broadway Artists Alliance in New York City.

She learned to play the Irish flute at the age of thirteen, having been "drawn" to the instrument from a young age. She is also able to play guitar, ukulele, electric piano, cajón, bodhrán and classical flute.

Reese attended Sidwell Friends School in Washington, D.C., and later Vassar College, New York where she initially studied cognitive science, before switching to Drama, in which she majored, and Religion, in which she minored. She also studied drama in London in 2014.

== Career ==
=== YouTube ===
==== Twisted Translations ====
Twisted Translations (formerly Google Translate Sings and Translator Fails) is Reese's initial YouTube channel, in which she translates song lyrics and other texts through Google Translate from English through other languages and back into English to create a parody of the song or text.

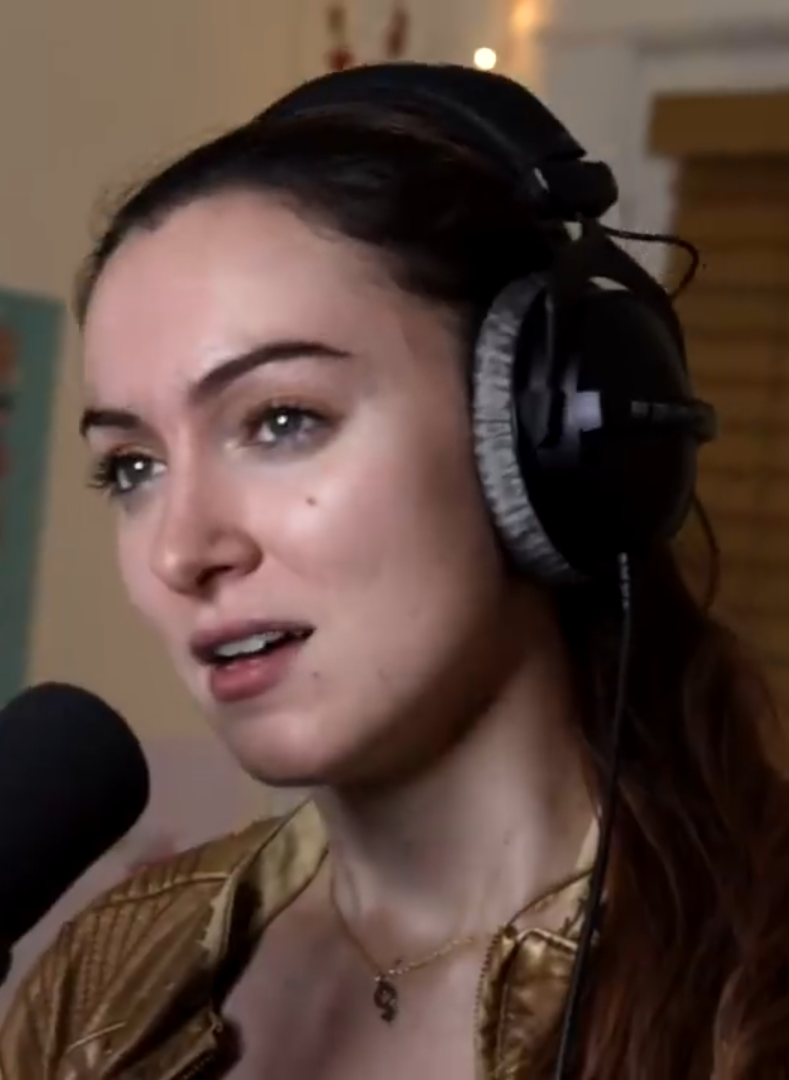
Reese in 2018

She came up with the idea of Twisted Translations while she was a student at Vassar College. After watching a video of "Let It Go" sung in various languages, she noticed that the Spanish translation wasn't exact. Her college friends began using Google Translate to create humorous alternatives to famous works of literature, inspiring Reese to do the same with song lyrics. Her first translation video was uploaded on February 10, 2014, and quickly went viral, amassing one million views within a week. On February 14, she announced on YouTube that she would create more translation videos. Other Twisted Translations songs include songs from Mulan, "One Day I'll Fly Away" from Moulin Rouge!, and "Hello" by Adele. Video output slowed by the early 2020s, with the final song translated as part of the series being "We Don't Talk About Bruno" from Encanto in March 2022." In February 2024 she announced that she would be moving on from the channel after 10 years, having felt the project was "complete."

==== MALINDA channel ====
In 2018, she launched another YouTube channel, MALINDA, which contains vlogs, song covers, and comedic songs, as well as her original songs. In March 2019, the channel surpassed 100,000 subscribers.

=== Music ===
In 2018, Reese launched her singing career. Her debut EP, Love Letter, was released on September 14, 2018. On May 15, 2020, she released the single "More With You", which involved a collaboration of more than 50 musicians from 17 countries. In 2021, she produced a cover of "The Wellerman" as part of the ‘ShantyTok’ trend on TikTok. She had previously created a shanty-style song about puffins on her YouTube channel, featuring user-submitted lyrics. On July 16, 2021, she released her second EP, The Folks I Love, a collection of Folk-style cover versions. On October 22, 2021, she released her third EP, Sea To Sky, a collection of four more folk covers.

In early 2022, she embarked on the Folks I Love Tour. In a video in October 2022, she announced that her debut album would be released in the spring of 2023. On April 28, 2023, she released her debut album, It's All True. It is accompanied by a visual album, premiering on April 30, 2023. In May 2023, she announced the "It's All True" tour, which she embarked on in September 2023, covering 27 cities in 16 states. On August 30, 2024, she released another EP of original music, Look At You Now, consisting of 5 different songs. She had plans to go on another tour, however, due to financial reasons, she had to cut this down to only five shows: one each in Boston, New York City, Philadelphia, the NPR Mountain Stage and Washington DC.

==== Singing in empty churches ====
In 2018, during a trip to Montefrío, Spain, she sang "O Come, O Come, Emmanuel" impromptu in Iglesia de la Incarnación when it was empty, so the sound resonated. Footage of the singing was uploaded to YouTube and went viral, to Reese's surprise. It was shared by Spanish news outlets and artists, including Alejandro Sanz. In 2019, she sang "How Can I Keep from Singing?" in Washington National Cathedral while empty.

=== Acting ===
Reese frequently performed as a child actor at the Kennedy Center in Washington, D.C. In 2017, Reese played the titular character in Ella Enchanted, a stage musical adapted from the book of the same name. The play was directed by her mother, Mary Hall Surface. DC Theatre Scene praised Reese's performance, calling it "truly enchanting".

In 2019, she starred as "Girl" in the stage production Once at the Olney Theatre Center. She received positive reviews. DC Metro Theatre Arts called her and Gregory Maheu, who portrayed "Guy", "standouts" and commented they "bring depth to both their solos and duets" while Washington Post said she was "effectively direct". Her performance won her a Helen Hayes Award for Best Actress in a Musical and a BroadwayWorld Washington, DC Awards for Best Actress in a Musical - Large Professional Theatre.

In May 2023, when "It's All True" was released, instead of traditional music videos, Malinda directed and starred in a visual album, a story about personal death, rebirth, mental health, dealing with the tragedies of the world, queer love and finding community. It featured Kyana Fanene as "Girlfriend" and Reese as "Girl" and "Soul".

== Personal life ==
In October 2022, Reese came out as bisexual in a video entitled "I have some things to tell you". She said she was inspired to come out publicly, after having previously been a "quiet queer", through her involvement with Irish music, which she saw as "music of the oppressed".

== Theatre ==
Year	Title	Role	Location
2016	The Second Shepherd's Play	Sheep/Ensemble	Elizabethan Theatre, Folger Shakespeare Library, Washington D.C.
2017	Ella Enchanted	Ella	Adventure Theatre, Glen Echo, Maryland
2017	Back to Methuselah: As Far as Thought Can Reach	Ecrasia	Undercroft Theatre, Mount Vernon Place United Methodist Church, Washington DC.
2017	Drumming with Dishes	Child	Lab Theatre at Convergence, Arlington, Virginia Atlas Performing Arts Center, Washington, D.C.
2018	The Skin of Our Teeth	Gladys	Source Theatre, Washington, D.C.
2019	Once	Girl	Olney Theatre Center, Olney, Maryland.
2021	Andrew A. Isen Cabaret Series	Herself	Olney Theatre Center, Olney, Maryland
2025	Waitress	Jenna	Olney Theatre Center, Olney, Maryland

== Discography ==
=== EPs ===
- Love Letter (2018)
- The Folks I Love (2021)
- Sea to Sky (2021)
- Look At You Now (2024)

=== Album ===
- It's All True (2023)
