= My Body No Choice =

American stage drama

- Original language: English

Premiere
- Date premiered: October 20 – November 6, 2022
- Place premiered: Arlene and Robert Kogod Cradle, Washington, DC

My Body No Choice is a 2022 American stage drama made up of eight collected monologues. The show was created and directed by Molly Smith, the Artistic Director of Arena Stage in Washington, DC. Each of the monologues that make up the play were commissioned from eight different female playwrights. The play was created in opposition of the 2022 U.S. Supreme Court ruling regarding Dobbs v. Jackson Women's Health Organization, which effectively overturned the constitutional right to abortion that had been established by Roe v. Wade in 1973. During the same time that it was being shown at Arena Stage, twenty other venues across the United States put on a production of the play.

== Background ==
In June 2022, the U.S. Supreme Court issued its judgement in Dobbs v. Jackson Women's Health Organization, No. 19-1392, 597 U.S. ___ (2022). The Supreme Court overruled Roe v. Wade (1973) on the grounds that the substantive right to abortion was not "deeply rooted in this Nation's history or tradition", nor considered a right when the Due Process Clause was ratified in 1868. The court said this "right" was unknown in U.S. law until Roe v. Wade. The court held that the constitution did not include an individual's right to abortion. This decision also overruled Planned Parenthood v. Casey (1992), and upended more than two decades of federal policy and medical practice. The ruling returned to individual states the power to regulate any aspect of abortion not protected by federal law.

Molly Smith, Artistic Director of Arena Stage, commissioned eight playwrights to write monologues in response to this action. The works were to be produced together under the title No Body No Choice.

The stage show was premiered in an October to early November run in 2022 at the Arlene and Robert Kogod Cradle in Washington, D.C., part of the Arena Stage complex. More than twenty readings and productions were also held in various universities and theaters across the country, in an artists' response to the ruling.

== Monologues ==
The short pieces consist of both fiction and non-fiction monologues that address issues of women's sexuality, autonomy, and freedom of choice. Several address decisions related to their bodies and having abortions.

Authors include established and rising writers: Lee Cataluna, Fatima Dyfan, Dale Orlandersmith, Sarah Ruhl, Mary Hall Surface, V (formerly writing as Eve Ensler, and Lisa Loomer. One woman chose to remain Anonymous.

Cast:

- Joy Jones — a woman contemplates having learned that her mother attempted to get an abortion after learning she was pregnant. Despite being unwanted, the woman became a success as an adult.
- - a student at a Catholic high school talks about the response to her having spoken there in favor of abortion.
- - a middle-aged woman recounts a miscarriage and related required surgery to avoid infection, with fear that such medical emergencies could be criminalized under punitive abortion laws.
- Dani Stoller — in "Battered Baby", a woman who suffered childhood and adult abuse feels newfound freedom after having been able to choose to have an abortion. The date is 4 July US Independence Day.
- Toni Rae Salmi, an older woman muses over her mother's unexpected decision to stop chemotherapy that was recommended by her doctor. She had always gone along with authority figures before but has decided for herself on this issue.
- Tori Gomez — a woman in the post-Dobbs world who lives in a state with severe restrictions and struggles to overcome obstacles and get an abortion.
- Deirdre Staples — a free thinking woman recounts her coming of age, sexual awakening, and successful efforts to avoid pregnancy.

In the monologue by Sarah Ruhl, a student shares experience about speaking in favor of abortion at a Catholic school. The monologue by Mary Hall Surface shares a disturbing account of a miscarriage to avoid risk of infection or hemorrhage, and expresses concern whether such medical emergencies would be criminalized in post-the June 2022 US supreme court judgement. The remaining monologues more broadly explore topics of bodily autonomy and freedom of choice. In Fatima Dyfan's piece, “A Rest Stop,” a free thinking, venturesome (Deidre Staples) presents her sexual awakening and successful effort to avoid getting pregnant. In Lee Cataluna's “Things My Mother Told Me”, an older woman (Toni Rae Salmi) dwells on her mother's unexpected decision to stop her doctor-recommended chemotherapy.

Lisa Loomer's “Roxy” is played as the last monologue in the sequence.

Monologue name	Playwright	Actress playing the role @ Arena Stage's Kogod Cradle Washington D.C.	Topic
An Uplifting High School Graduation Speech	Sarah Ruhl	Jennifer Mendenhall	a student at a Catholic school makes a speech on behalf of abortion rights, which the Church opposes
Chance	Mary Hall Surface	Shanara Gabrielle	a middle-aged woman suffers a miscarriage
A Rest Stop	Fatima Dyfan	Deidre Staples	coming-of-age and sexual awakening
The Circumstances of My Birth	Anon	Joy Jones	A successful woman reflects on learning that her mother had sought an abortion long before she was born.
Battered Baby	V (formerly Eve Ensler)	Dani Stoller	Survivor of child abuse and domestic violence, gains autonomy with abortion.
Gravitas	Dael Orlandersmith	Felicia P. Fields	body shaming
Things My Mother Told Me	Lee Cataluna	Toni Rae Salmi	End of life; a woman decides to end chemotherapy to concentrate on quality of life
Roxy	Lisa Loomer	Tori Gomez	Anger about the bind that state laws can create after the U.S. Supreme Court's overturning of Roe v. Wade

== Reception ==
According to Peter Marks, "let women decide for their own bodies" is the simple message this show intends to give; it is not ground breaking but ground claiming. Director Molly Smith said she received some complaints from anti-abortion patrons, but also received substantial support from supporters of abortion choice.

== See also ==
- Abortion debate
- Abortion-rights movements
- My body, my choice
- Our Bodies, Ourselves
- Planned Parenthood
- Sexual and reproductive health and rights
- Theater in the United States
