= Hernani (drama) =

Play by Victor Hugo

Hernani ou l'Honneur Castillan
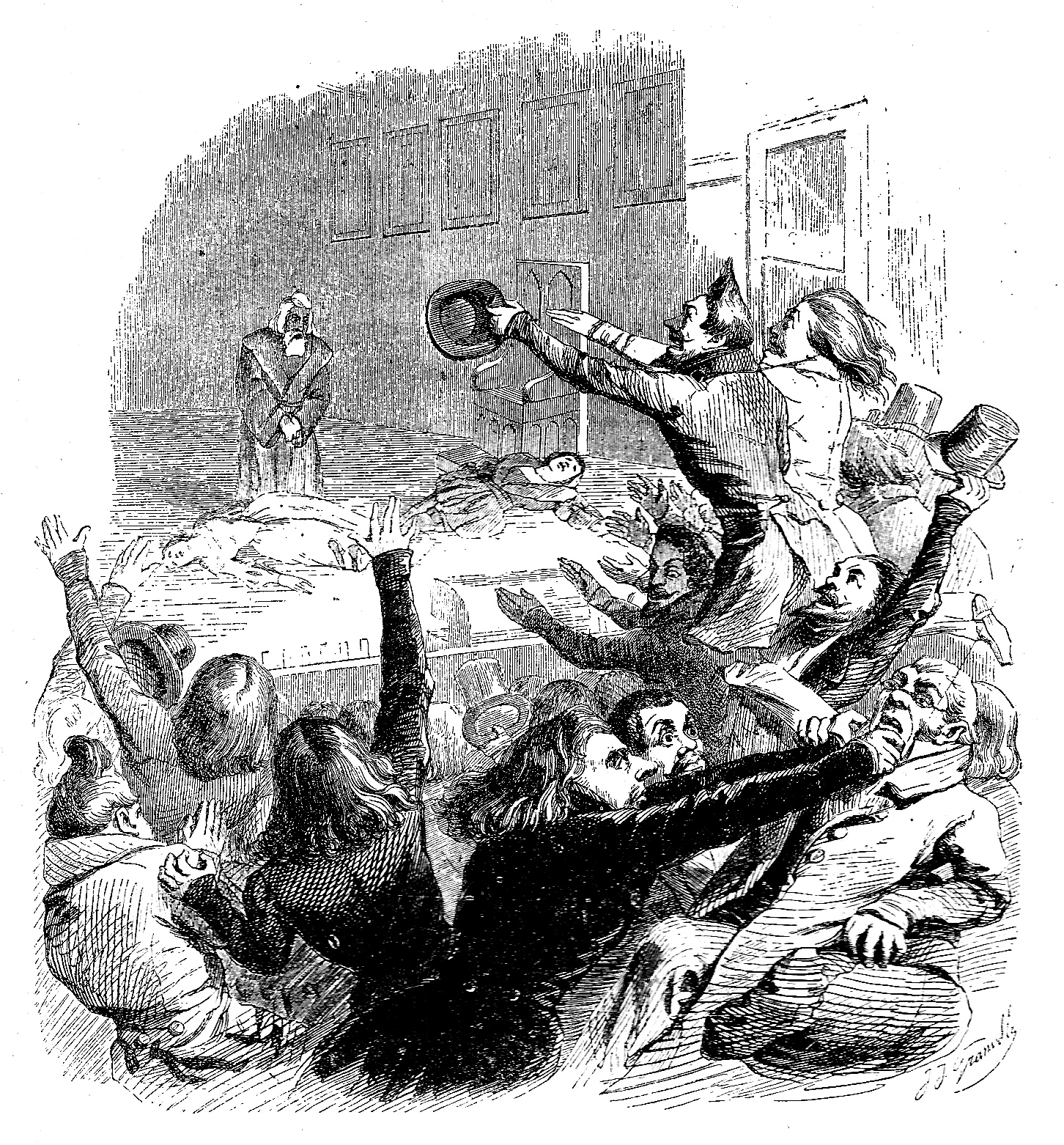
- The audience fights during the premiere
- Original language: French
- Written by: Victor Hugo
- Characters: Doña Sol; Don Carlos; Hernani; Don Ruy Gomes de Silva; others
- Subject: Courtly romance
- Genre: Drama
- Setting: Spanish court, 1519

Premiere
- Date: 25 February 1830
- Place: Paris

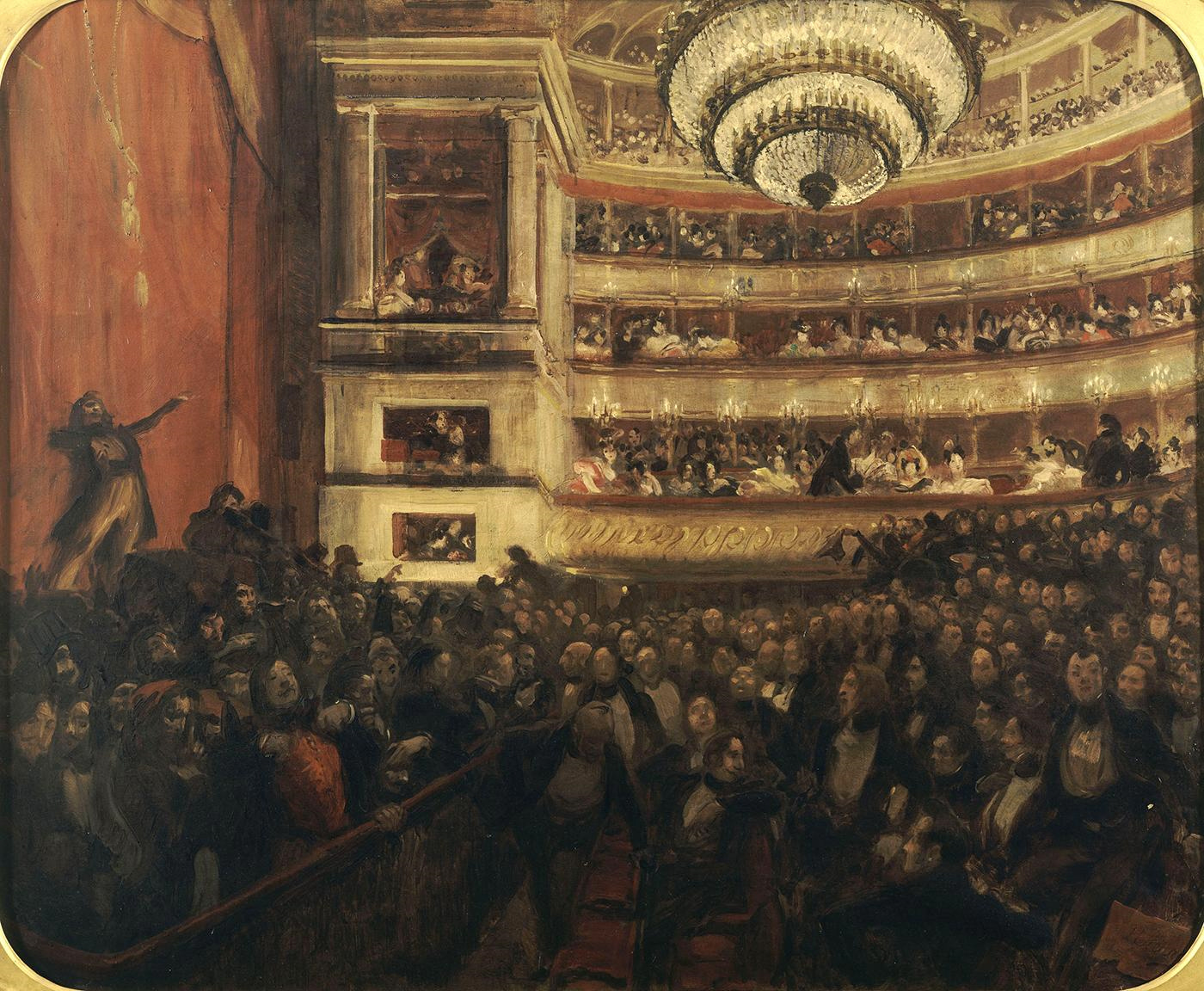
The "battle of Hernani"

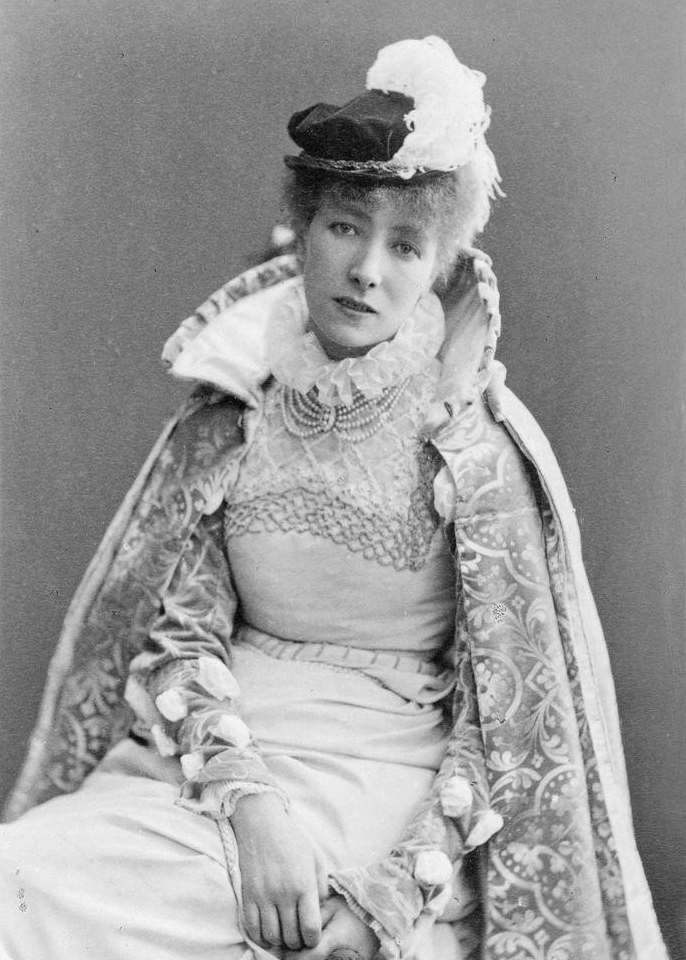
Sarah Bernhardt as Doña Sol (1877)

Hernani (full title: Hernani, ou l'Honneur Castillan) is a drama in rhyming alexandrines by the French romantic author Victor Hugo.

== Title origin ==
The title originates from Hernani, a Spanish town in the Southern Basque Country, where Hugo's mother and her three children stopped on their way to General Hugo's place of residence.

== History ==
The play was given its premiere on 25 February 1830 by the Comédie-Française in Paris. Today, it is more remembered for the demonstrations which accompanied the first performance and for being the inspiration for Giuseppe Verdi's opera Ernani than it is for its own merits. Hugo had enlisted the support of fellow Romanticists such as Hector Berlioz and Théophile Gautier to combat the opposition of Classicists who recognised the play as a direct attack on their values.

In Edgar Allan Poe's short story "The Masque of the Red Death", Hernani is used to describe the magnitude and elegance of Prince Prospero's masquerade. Gillenormand in Les Misérables criticizes Hernani.

Verdi's opera Ernani, with an Italian libretto by Francesco Maria Piave, was based on the play, and first performed in Venice in 1844.

An English-language adaption by the American playwright John Strand appeared in 2013.

== Plot ==
Set in a fictitious version of the Spanish court of 1519, it is based on courtly romance and intrigues. Three men — two noblemen and a mysterious bandit — are in love with the same woman. What follows in the ensuing chaos of action prompted the biographer of Hugo, J.P. Houston, to write "... and a résumé [plot synopsis] will necessarily fail, as in the case of Notre-Dame de Paris, to suggest anything like the involution of its details".

=== Act I ===
In the first scenes Hugo introduces Don Carlos, King of Spain (the future Charles V, Holy Roman Emperor) sneaking into the bedchamber of Doña Sol. He forces her maid to help conceal him within the room. Shortly thereafter, Doña Sol enters to welcome her lover Hernani. Hernani and Sol discuss their situation − Doña Sol is about to be forced to marry her elderly uncle, and Hernani is a bandit whose father was executed by the previous King. Hernani and Doña Sol plot to run away together, but Don Carlos emerges from the cabinet where he was hiding, disrupting them. The two men clash swords, but are interrupted by Sol's uncle and fiancé Don Ruy Gomez de Silva. He demands to know why both men are in Sol's private chambers. Don Carlos reveals his identity, and asserts that he had come hoping to meet Ruy Gomez to discuss the recent death of Emperor Maximilian, and claims that Hernani is a member of his entourage, thereby allowing everyone to leave peacefully.

=== Act II ===
Don Carlos had overheard Sol and Hernani's plans to run away together, and, accompanied by some aristocratic friends, he appears at the rendezvous point, hoping to seduce Sol in Hernani's place. Doña Sol recognizes him and rejects him. Infuriated, Don Carlos attempts to abduct her. As Don Carlos and Doña Sol struggle over a dagger, Hernani arrives with his own sixty men having overtaken the king's three friends. He explains his hatred for the king over the death of his own father, and challenges Don Carlos to a duel. This time, the King is aware of Hernani's identity as a bandit, and he refuses a duel (as only noblemen could duel), but challenges Hernani to murder him. Hernani's sense of honor prevents him from attacking a man who won't fight back. The King escapes, and sends his men to arrest Hernani and his band of thieves. Hernani escapes after a farewell to Doña Sol.

=== Act III ===
Doña Sol and Ruy Gomez prepare for their wedding, and hear news that Hernani's men have all been murdered. Hernani arrives at the house in disguise, and Ruy Gomez takes him in as a guest. Hernani − apparently suicidal − reveals his identity and tries to provoke the servants to arrest him, but Ruy Gomez still insists on protecting him. Hernani admonishes Doña Sol for agreeing to the marriage, but when she reveals that she plans to kill herself on the wedding night, he has a change of heart and encourages her to accept the match. Ruy Gomez is appalled to learn of Sol and Hernani's relationship, considering it a betrayal of his hospitality, but he still continues his protection. The King arrives to arrest Hernani, but Ruy Gomez refuses to surrender him, citing laws of hospitality, which, he asserts, protect his guests even from the King. The King threatens Ruy Gomez, and Doña Sol intercedes for him. The King forgives Ruy Gomez but abducts Doña Sol. Alone, Ruy Gomez releases Hernani, initially intending to fight him to the death; but when Hernani learns of Doña Sol's abduction he insists on trying to rescue her and promises to surrender himself to Ruy Gomez after Sol is safe. Hernani secures his promise by giving Ruy Gomez a horn to blow to announce the moment when Hernani should die.

=== Act IV ===
Two months later, in June 1519, in Aachen (capital of the Holy Roman Empire), Don Carlos is awaiting the results of the imperial election while thwarting a conspiracy; among the conspirators are Don Ruy Gomez and Hernani. The latter, appointed to assassinate the king, refuses to give way to Don Ruy Gomez, who nevertheless asks him to break the pact. Don Carlos is elected emperor. He pardons the conspirators and announces the marriage of Doña Sol to Hernani. Hernani reveals his true identity: he is John of Aragon, noble but born in exile; and he abandons his idea of revenge.

=== Act V ===
Sol and Hernani are married, but, as they enjoy their wedding feast, Hernani hears the call of the horn blown by Ruy Gomez. As Hernani is about to drink poison, Doña Sol enters the room and tries to convince him that he is hers and he does not have to listen to her uncle. She is unable to persuade him otherwise. Doña Sol, shocked by Hernani's decision to kill himself, drinks half of the poison. Hernani drinks the other half and they die in each other's arms. Ruy Gomez de Silva kills himself.

== Characters ==
Role	Description
Hernani	Son of the recently murdered king, in love with Dona Sol.
Dona Sol de Silva	In love with Hernani, but betrothed to Gomez.
Don Carlos	The king of Spain, also in love with Dona Sol.
Don Ruy Gomez de Silva	Duke of Pastrana, Dona Sol's uncle and her fiancé.

Don Carlos is a fictionalized version of King Carlos I, later Holy Roman Emperor Charles V. Don Ruy Gomez de Silva, Duke of Pastrana, gets his name from an actual duke by that name, though the fictional version is an old man in 1519, whereas the actual de Silva would have been a toddler at this date. Hernani's name comes from a Basque town where Hugo once stayed.

== See also ==
- Battle of Hernani
