= John Strand =

American playwright

John Gregory Strand is a contemporary American playwright. At times he has published under the name "J.G. Strand". Among his plays are Lincolnesque, Three Nights in Tehran, The Diaries, Otabenga, and The Originalist. Tom Walker is an adaption of The Devil and Tom Walker by Washington Irving. He has also written a number of English-language adaptions of plays written in French: among these are Lovers and Executioners (Antoine Jacob de Montfleury's La Femme Juge et Partie), for which he won the 1999 Charles MacArthur Award; The Miser (Molière); Lorenzaccio (Alfred de Musset); Hat! (Eugène Labiche's Un Chapeau de Paille d'Italie); and Hernani (Victor Hugo). In 1985 he launched (along with Kathy Acker, Eduard Limonov, and Bernard-Henri Lévy) a Paris-based literary magazine called Paris Exiles. A novel, Commieland, appeared in 2013.

== See also ==
- The Originalist
- Arena Stage
