= Molly Smith =

American theatre director

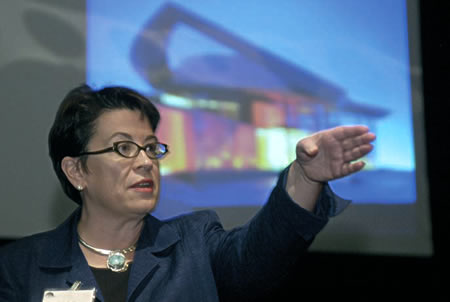
Arena Stage Artistic Director Molly Smith presents the design for its new Mead Center for American Theater in 2007.

Molly Smith is an American theatre director who was the artistic director of Arena Stage in Washington, D.C. from 1998 to 2023. During this period, she emphasized promoting new American plays, playwrights, and voices, producing 200 works. In addition, she helped originate 150 works by workshops and commissions at the Arena.

She also drove the development and design of a complex called The Mead Center for American Theater, completed in 2010. The project included renovations of the two existing theaters, and construction of a third theater, and related spaces to bring all functions to the site. With this, Arena became the largest regional theater in Washington and second to the Kennedy Center.

In 1979 Smith had founded the Perseverance Theatre in her home town of Juneau, Alaska, soon after completing her master's in theatre at American University. She led the theatre company as artistic director until 1998. In addition to building audience and community through established works, she directed several world premieres of new works by rising American playwrights.

== Biography ==
Born and raised in a theater family in Juneau, Alaska, Smith moved to the Lower 48 for college and graduate school. She attended Catholic University (Washington, D.C.), and received a master's degree in 1978 in theatre from American University.

She returned to Juneau, where in 1979 she founded the Perseverance Theatre. Smith led this company as artistic director until 1998. Smith commissioned numerous world premieres at the Perseverance Theatre, including Paula Vogel's Pulitzer Prize-winning How I Learned to Drive and The Mineola Twins, Tim Acito’s The Women of Brewster Place, Moises Kaufman’s 33 Variations, Charles Randolph-Wright's Blue, Zora Neale Hurston's lost play, Polk County; and Sarah Ruhl's Passion Play, a cycle.

=== Artistic Director of Arena Stage ===
In 1998, Smith returned to Washington when she was selected as Artistic Director of Arena Stage. Her emphasis was on encouraging production of American plays, from both established and new playwrights, encouraging new voices by developing writers through commissions and workshops, and focusing on American stories.

She founded Arena's "downstairs series," which has held readings and workshopped some 60 plays, many of have later received full productions. Through the Power Plays initiative, from 2016 to 2024 Arena has commissioned 25 new plays related to American history.

=== Additional projects ===
Smith has also directed at the Shaw Festival in Canada (2007), Berkeley Repertory Theatre, Trinity Repertory Company, Tarragon Theatre in Toronto, and Centaur Theatre in Montreal, and includes the shows South Pacific, Mack and Mabel, Anna Christie, Cat on a Hot Tin Roof, The Music Man, and My Fair Lady.

Smith has served as Literary Adviser to the Sundance Theatre Lab. She formed the Arena Stage Writers Council in partnership with Georgetown University. The Council is composed of leading American playwrights and promotes development. Smith brings artists of international renown to the Arena. She is a member of the Board of the Theatre Communications Group, as well as the Center for International Theatre Development.

She has also directed two feature films. Raven's Blood (1997) was adapted from the mystery novel, Death of an Alaskan Princess, by Bridget Smith, and filmed in Juneau. A major community effort, it featured many local actors and extras. She also directed Making Contact (1999).

In 2014 Smith married her longtime partner, Suzanne Blue Star Boy, in a ceremony officiated by Supreme Court Justice Ruth Bader Ginsburg. They had met in Alaska. The ceremony was held in the Kogod Cradle of the Arena's complex, with the reception on the outdoor terrace and in the rehearsal hall.

== Legacy and honors ==
Smith led the development of Arena Stage as a center for new American plays, artists, and voices. Some 200 works were produced, including by established American playwrights. She directed many new works, and invited diverse actors and directors to participate in productions. Some 150 works were originated in readings, workshops and related initiatives at the Arena Stage. From 2016 to 2024, a total of 25 plays have been commissioned related to American history. The Mead Center for American Theater, completed in 2010, is one of her legacies.

Smith has received Honorary Doctorates from Towson and American universities.

She organized a march on the National Mall for gun control on January 26, 2013.

== See also ==
- My Body No Choice
