= La Encarnación, Marbella =

Church in Marbella, Spain

Coordinates: 36.5098°N 4.8838°W

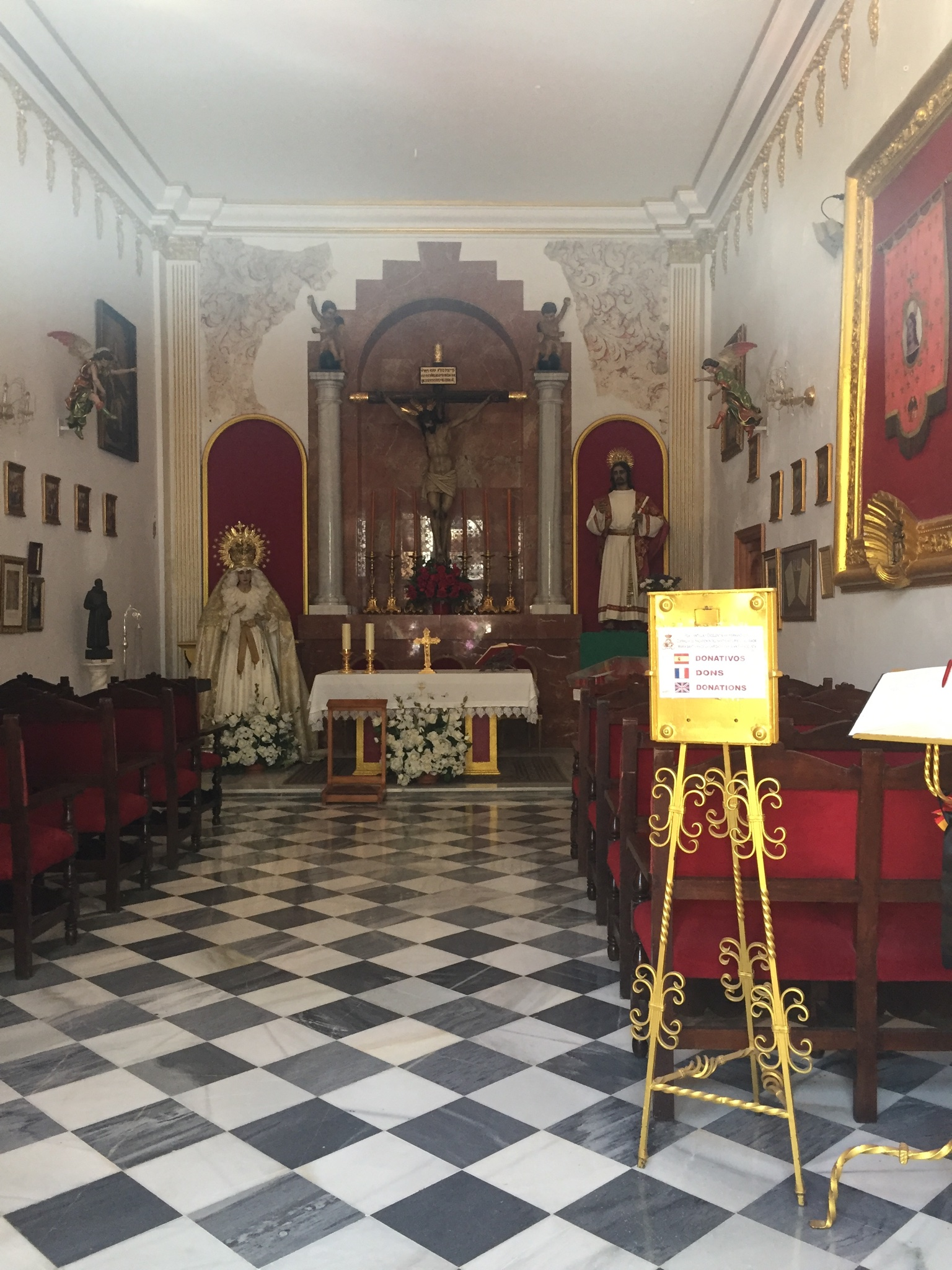
Interior and place of worship of the Church of the Incarnation.

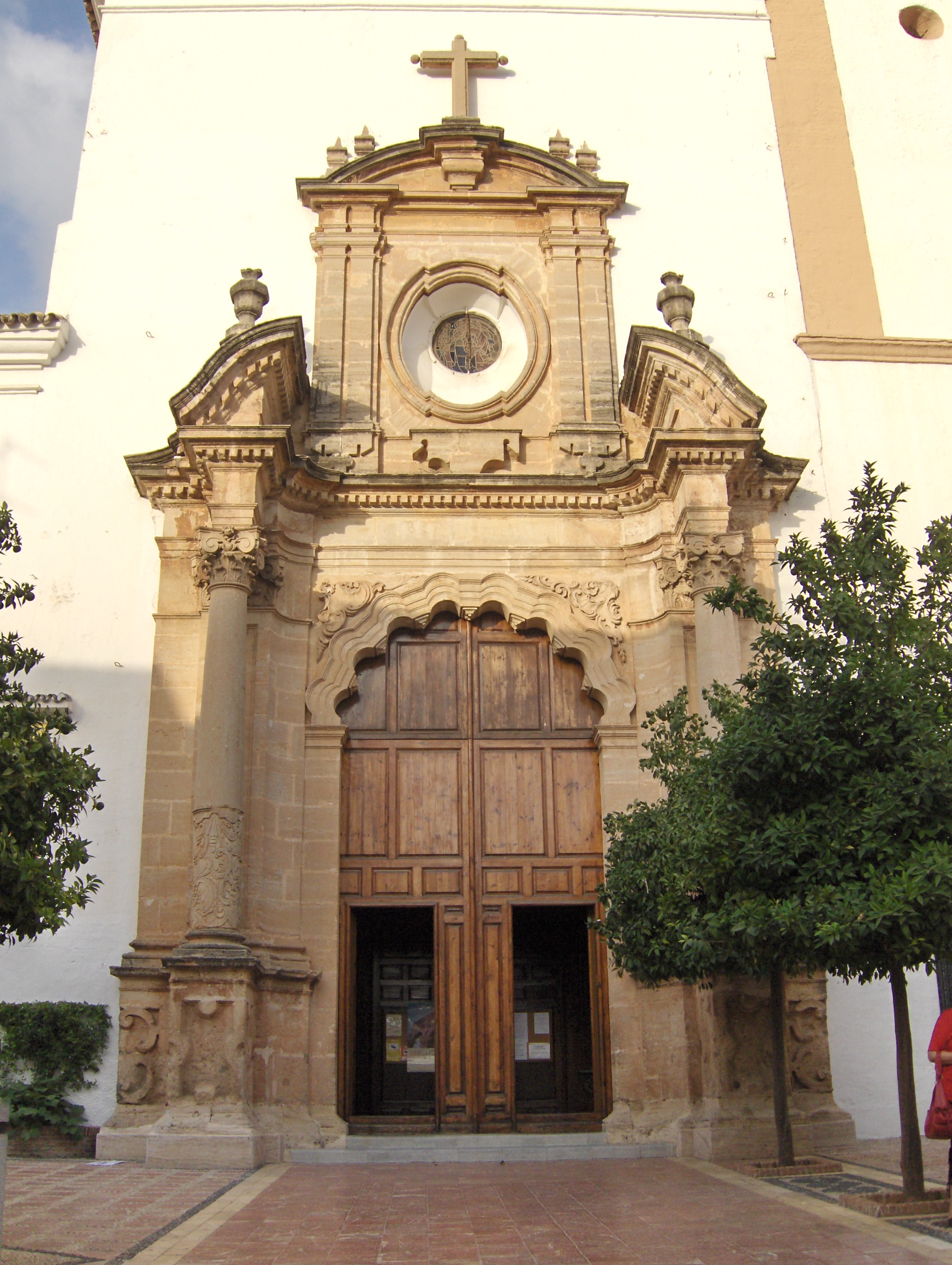
Church of Encarnación .

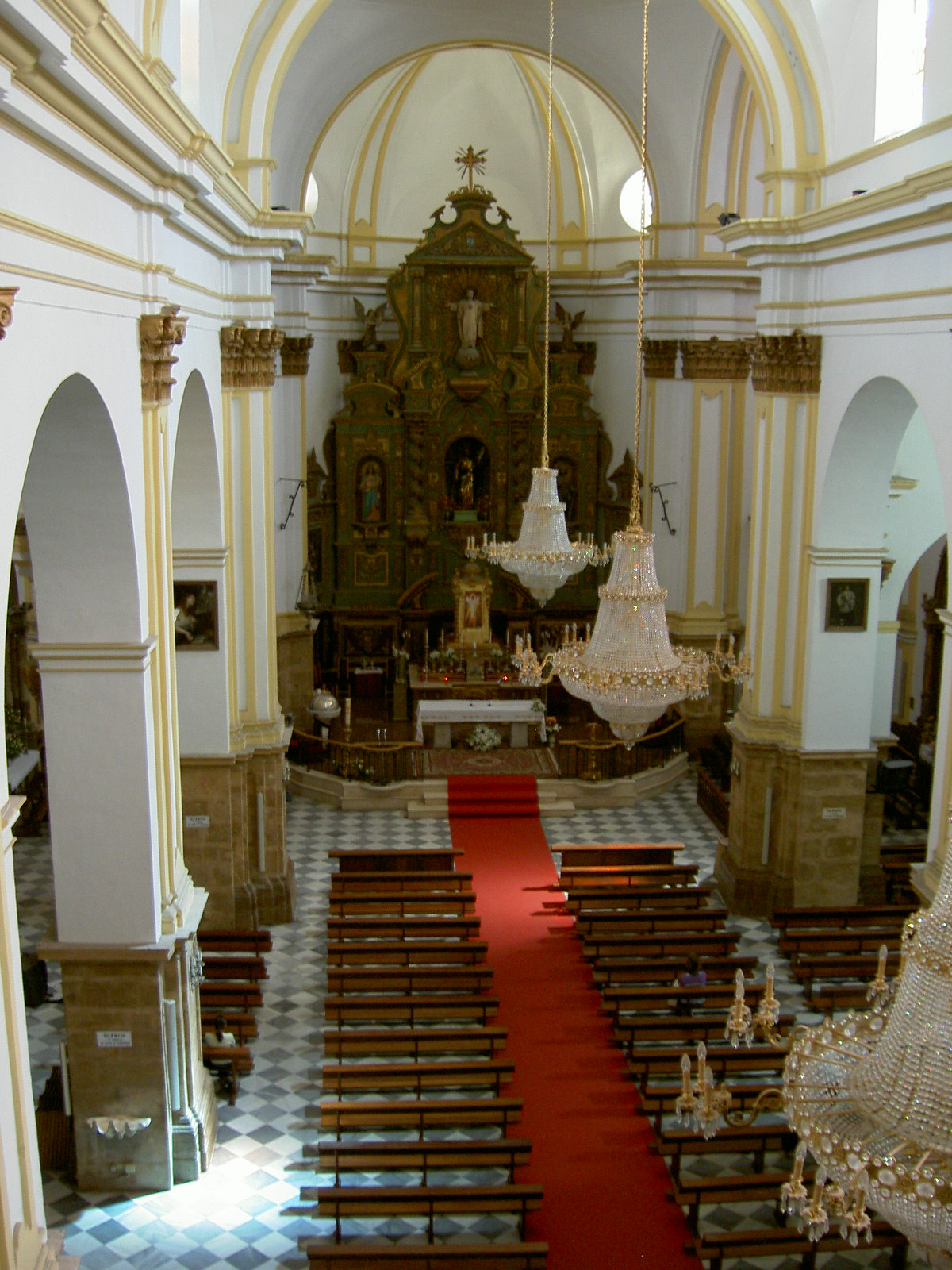
Iglesia de la Encarnación interior

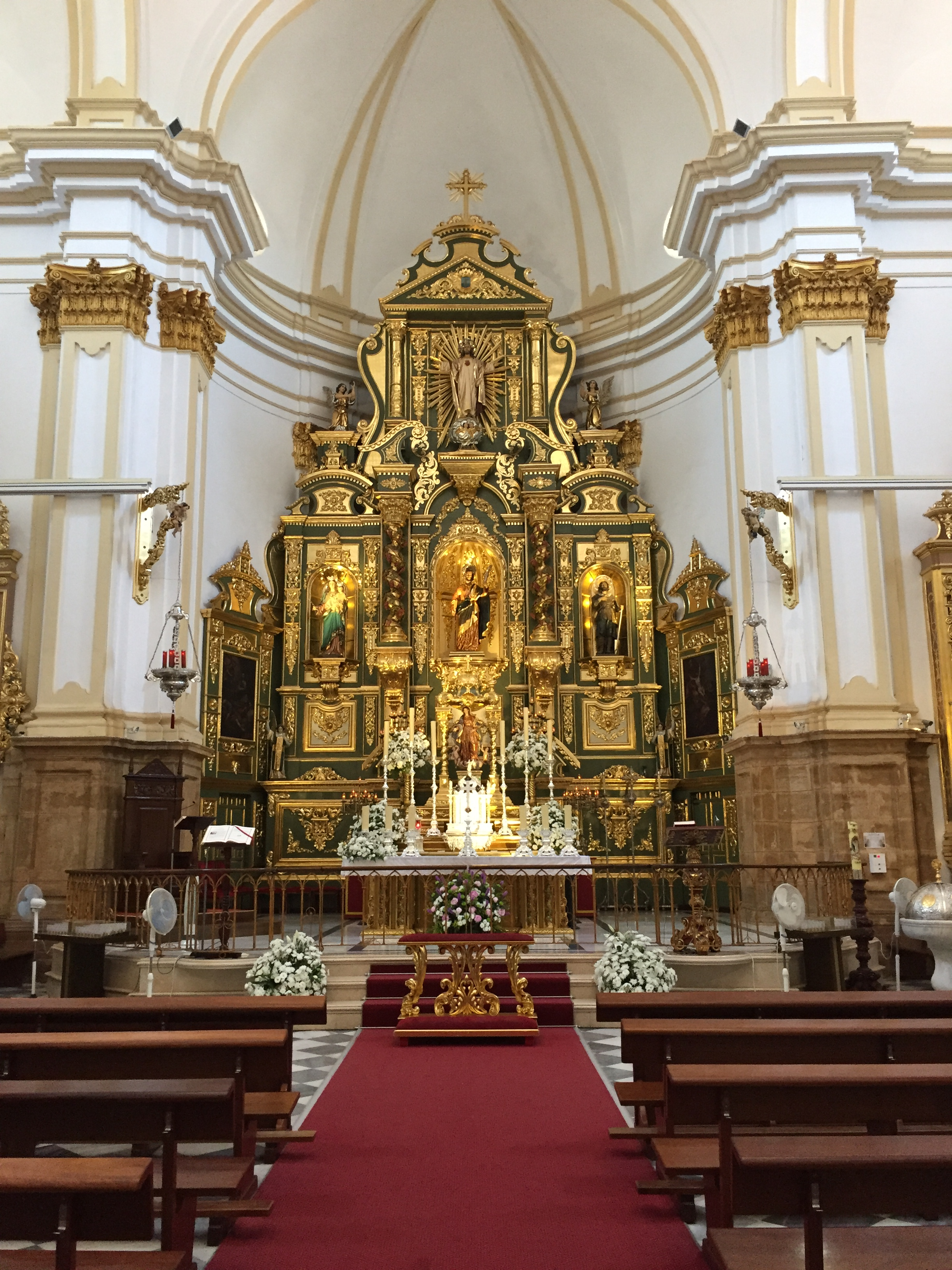
The Church of the Incarnation in Marbella, Spain

The Iglesia de la Encarnación (Church of the Incarnation) is a church in Marbella, southern Spain. It was built in the 16th and 17th century.
