= Arena Stage =

Regional theater in Washington D.C.

- Formation: 1950
- Type: Theatre group
- Purpose: American Plays & Playwrights
- Website: arenastage.org
Mead Center for American Theater
- Interactive map of Mead Center for American Theater
- Address: 1101 Sixth Street; Southwest, Washington, D.C. United States
- Coordinates: 38°52′38″N 77°01′13″W
- Capacity: Fichandler Stage: 680; Kreeger Theater: 510; Kogod Cradle: 202
- Public transit: Waterfront station (Washington Metro) Metrobus (Washington, D.C.)
Construction
- Opened: 1960
- Renovated: 2008–2010

Arena Stage is a not-for-profit regional theater based in Southwest, Washington, D.C. Established in 1950, it was the first racially integrated theater in Washington, D.C., and its founders helped start the U.S. regional theater movement. It has three stages.

Arena Stage is currently led by President and Executive Producer Edgar Dobie, after Artistic Director Hana S. Sharif resigned effective June 30, 2026. It is the largest company in the country dedicated to American plays and playwrights. Arena Stage commissions and develops new plays through its Power Plays initiative. The company serves an annual audience of more than 300,000. Its productions have received numerous local and national awards, including the Tony Award for best regional theater and over 600 Helen Hayes Awards.

== History ==
=== Founding, location, and theaters ===
The company was founded in Washington, D.C., in 1950 by Zelda and Thomas Fichandler and Edward Mangum. Its first home was the Hippodrome Theatre, a former movie house. In 1956, the company moved into the gymnasium of the old Heurich Brewery in Foggy Bottom; the theater was nicknamed "The Old Vat."

In 1960, the company moved into its current complex on Sixth Street, which was designed for them by Chicago architect Harry Weese. He also designed the Arena's Kreeger Theater, which opened in 1970. In 1966, Robert Alexander joined the company and created the Living Stage as a social outreach improvisational theater. From 2008 to 2010, the complex was renovated and a third theatre was added, together with a variety of support spaces. The new complex, with the theatres under a glass skin, was named as the Mead Center for American Theater. Its outdoor terrace overlooks the Southwest Waterfront.

=== Inclusion and diversity focus ===
Arena was the first theatre in D.C. to be racially integrated. Its production The Great White Hope, which opened at Arena Stage in 1967, was transferred to Broadway with its original cast, including James Earl Jones and Jane Alexander in the lead roles. Arena was the first regional theater to transfer a production to Broadway. When Arena Stage reprised the play in 2000 as part of its 50th-anniversary celebration, Mahershala Ali was cast as the male lead. It was his first professional role.

In 1968, the company received a $250,000 grant from the Ford Foundation. Part of it was to be used for the training of black actors. In 1987, Arena hosted a symposium on nontraditional casting. In 1989, the company received a $1 million grant from the National Endowment for the Arts to train minority actors, directors, designers and administrators, and to produce plays from non-white cultures.

In the latter half of the 20th century, the company traveled abroad. In 1973, they performed Thornton Wilder's Our Town and Jerome Lawrence and Robert E. Lee's Inherit the Wind in the Soviet Union after being encouraged by the U.S. State Department to do so. This made them the first regional theater to present U.S. plays in the USSR.

In 1980 Arena Stage was the first American theater company to be invited to the Hong Kong Arts Festival. It attended the Israel Festival in Jerusalem in 1987. In the U.S., to promote cultural diversity, Zelda Fichandler included plays from the Soviet Union, Romania, Poland, Hungary, Austria, East and West Germany, France, Switzerland, England, Canada, and Australia in the theater's repertoire. In 1991, Arena raised $4 million for a cultural diversity grant. This became the Allen Lee Hughes Fellowship Program.

In 1981, Arena developed Audio Description for visually impaired audience members. This made the company the first theater to create audio-described performances.

In 1976, Arena Stage became the first theater outside New York to receive a special Tony Award for theatrical excellence.

=== Original plays and films ===
In 2016, artistic director Molly Smith announced the Power Plays initiative to commission 25 original plays and musicals over the next 10 years to showcase American history from 1776 to modern day. These have included works by Jacqueline Lawton, Eve Ensler, Rajiv Joseph, Mary Kathryn Nagle, Sarah Ruhl, Lawrence Wright, Eduardo Machado, Aaron Posner, John Strand, Craig Lucas, Kenneth Lin, and Nathan Alan Davis.

During the coronavirus pandemic, Arena Stage launched the Artists Marketplace as a way for people to commission or purchase work from the artists who have worked with the company.

The company also produced three films: May 22, 2020, a docudrama that follows D.C.-Maryland-Virginia residents and captures a day in their lives during the pandemic; Inside Voices, which features the stories of kids during the pandemic; and The 51st State, about the D.C. statehood movement.

In 2021, the company released a three-part commissioned music series called Arena Riffs as part of its reopening.

== Timeline ==
| Date | Event | Source |
|---|---|---|
| 1950 | Arena Stage is founded as the first racially integrated theatre in Washington, D.C. | |
| 1959 | Arena Stage becomes a not-for-profit | |
| 1961 | The company's new complex, designed by Harry Weese, opens | |
| 1967 | The Great White Hope featuring James Earl Jones and Jane Alexander debuts | |
| 1971 | The company's Kreeger Theater opens | |
| 1973 | Arena is the first regional theater to tour behind the Iron Curtain | |
| 1976 | The company is awarded the Special Tony Award for Outstanding Regional Theater | |
| 1980 | Arena Stage is the first American theater company invited to the international Hong Kong Arts Festival | |
| 1981 | The company develops Audio Description for visually impaired audiences | |
| 1982 | Premier of Patrick Meyers' K2 | |
| 1985 | The creation of a resident acting company | |
| 1987 | The company attends the Israel Festival in Jerusalem and presents The Crucible | |
| 1994 | The Price breaks existing box office records | |
| 2009 | Launch of the American Voices New Play Institute | |
| 2010 | The Price breaks existing box office records | |
| 2015 | Dear Evan Hansen premieres at Arena Stage | |
| 2016 | Commissioning of 25 original works announced under the Power Plays initiative | |
| 2017 | Dear Evan Hansen wins 6 Tony Awards, including Best Musical | |

== Renovation and new construction, 2008–2010 ==
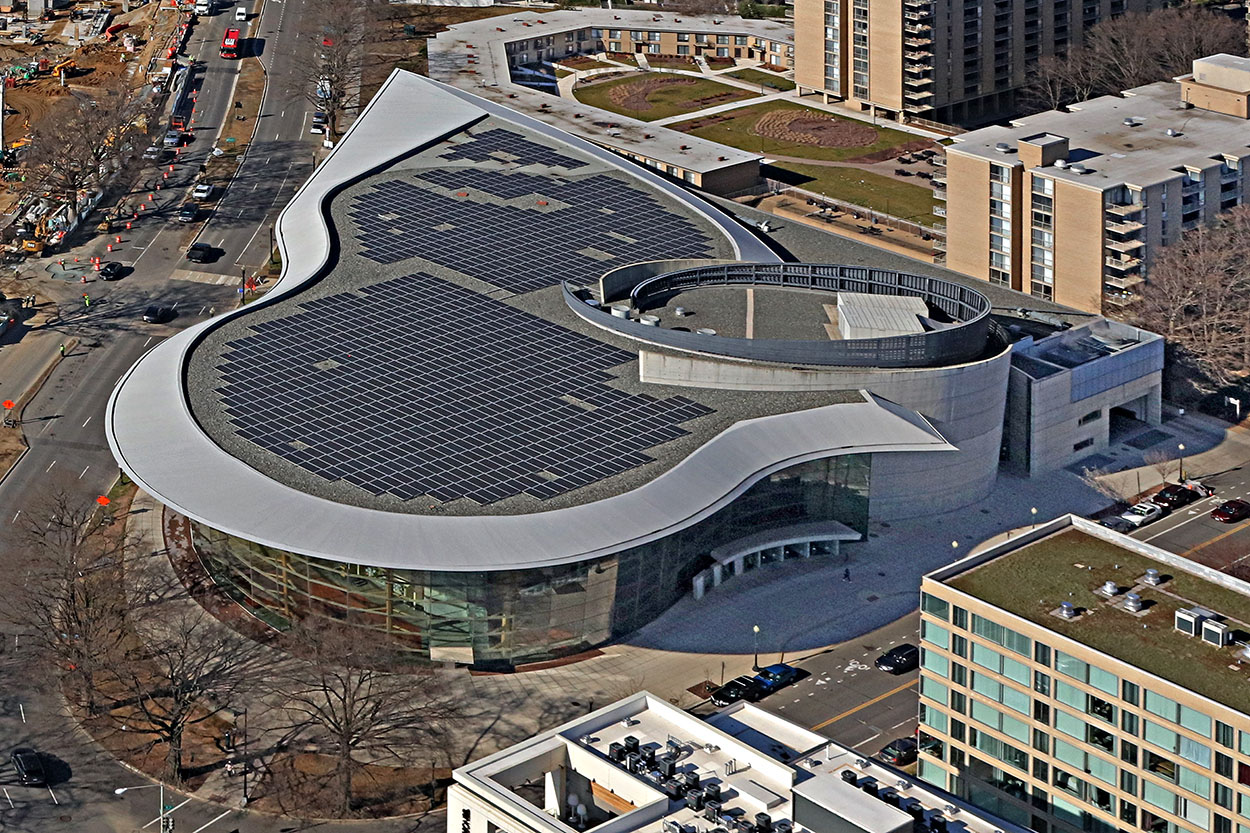
Arena Stage December 2020

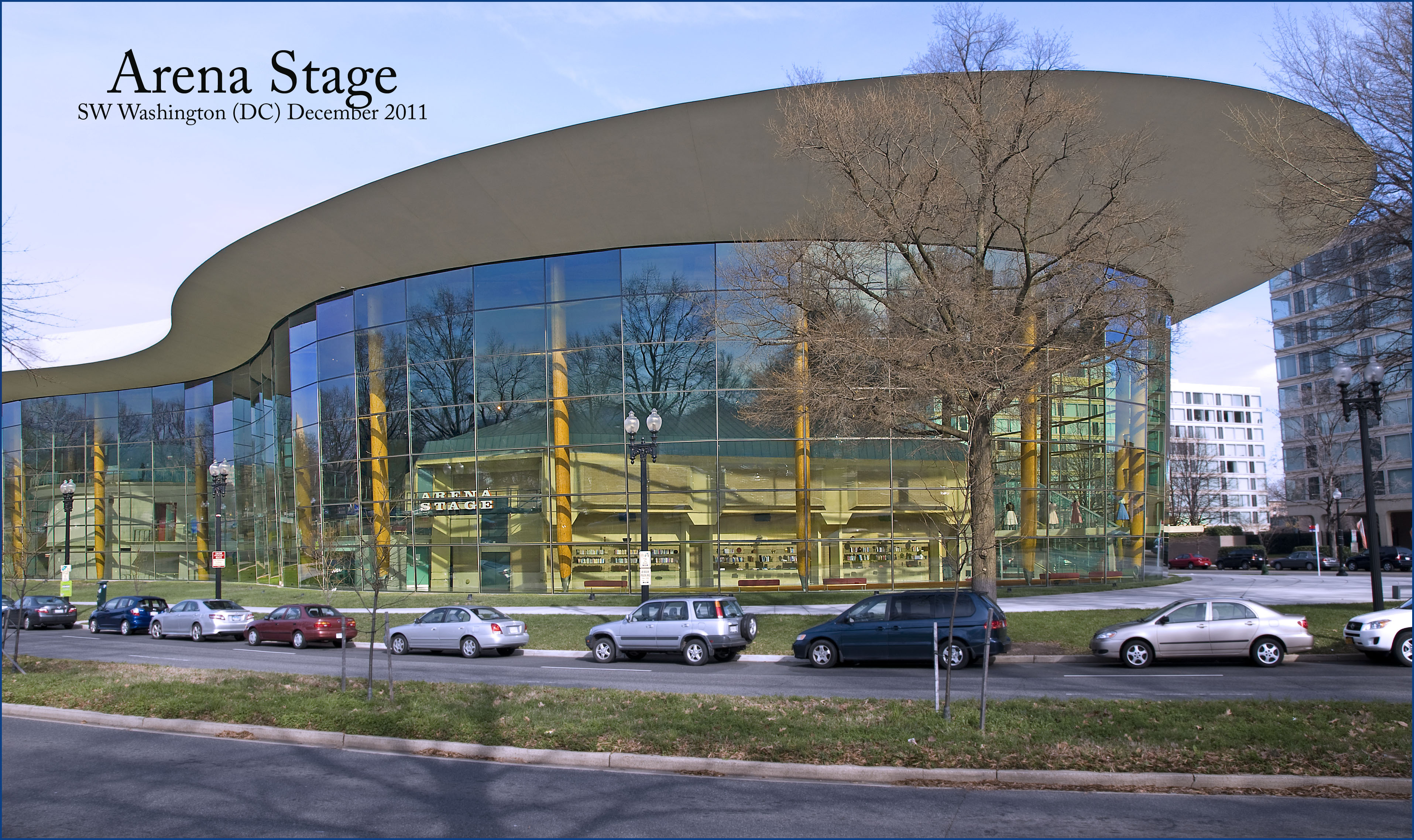
Arena Stage, 2011

A major renovation of the facility was undertaken from 2008 through 2010. The architect for the project was Bing Thom Architects of Vancouver, British Columbia, Canada, who contracted Fast + Epp consulting engineers to design the main columns for the building. During the renovation, Arena Stage temporarily moved to the Crystal Forum and the Lincoln Theatre.

The Arena's existing theaters, the Fichandler Stage and the Kreeger Theater, were enclosed under a glass "skin" together with a new theater, the Arlene and Robert Kogod Cradle. The entire $135 million complex was renamed "Arena Stage at the Mead Center for American Theater" in honor of supporters Gilbert and Jaylee Mead. The new building also includes a central lobby, restaurant, and the Catwalk Cafe, and such support spaces as rehearsal rooms, classrooms, production shops, and offices. The restaurant, Richard's Place, is closed for the 2021–2022 season.

For the first time in the company's history, all staff and operations were joined under one unifying roof. The three-stage theater complex is now the second-largest performing arts center in Washington, DC, after the Kennedy Center for the Performing Arts. It is the largest regional theater in D.C. Arena Stage re-opened in October 2010 with Oklahoma!.

The capacity of its three theaters follows:

- The Fichandler Stage, a theater in the round, seating 680.
- The Kreeger Theater, a modified thrust stage theater, seating 510.
- The Kogod Cradle, a 202-seat space dedicated to new American productions.

== Artistic Directors ==
One of the founders, Zelda Fichandler, was the company's artistic director from its founding through the 1990/91 season. Douglas C. Wager succeeded her for the 1991/92 through 1997/98 seasons. Molly Smith assumed those duties beginning with the 1998/99 season. In June 2022, she announced she would retire and leave Arena Stage in July 2023. Hana S. Sharif then took over as Artistic Director, serving in the role until her resignation in June 2026 amid reports of workplace tensions throughout her tenure.

== Original works ==
- Camp David by Lawence Wright
- Celia and Fidel by Eduardo Machado
- Change Agent by Craig Lucas
- Dear Evan Hansen
- Exclusion by Kenneth Lin
- The High Ground by Nathan Alan Davis
- JQA by Aaron Posner
- Loose Ends by Michael Weller
- The Originalist by John Strand
- Tintypes, conceived by Mary Kyte with Mel Marvin and Gary Pearle

== Notable events ==
The Washingtonian magazine, as part of its 50th anniversary commemoration, identified the Arena Stage's 1967 production of The Great White Hope as one of "50 Moments That Shaped Washington, DC". The play received a lot of attention, some of it negative, because it featured an interracial relationship between James Earl Jones, then a new actor, and Jane Alexander. It was one of the first regional-theater productions to move to Broadway. There the production won several Tony Awards, and a Pulitzer Prize. It was also adapted as a film. Zelda Fichandler worked with the writer of the play for a year to make it production-ready. The Arena did not earn a share of the play's Broadway and film profits.

== See also ==
- Theater in Washington D.C.
- Architecture of Washington, D.C.

== Archival material ==
A collection of the Arena Stage records and materials is housed at the George Mason University Special Collections Research Center. The Research Center also houses materials related to individuals involved with the theater, including personal records of Zelda Fichandler's, Thomas Fichandler's papers, the Ken Kitch papers, and materials relating to the Living Stage.
