= Zora Martin-Felton =

American museum director (1930–2022)

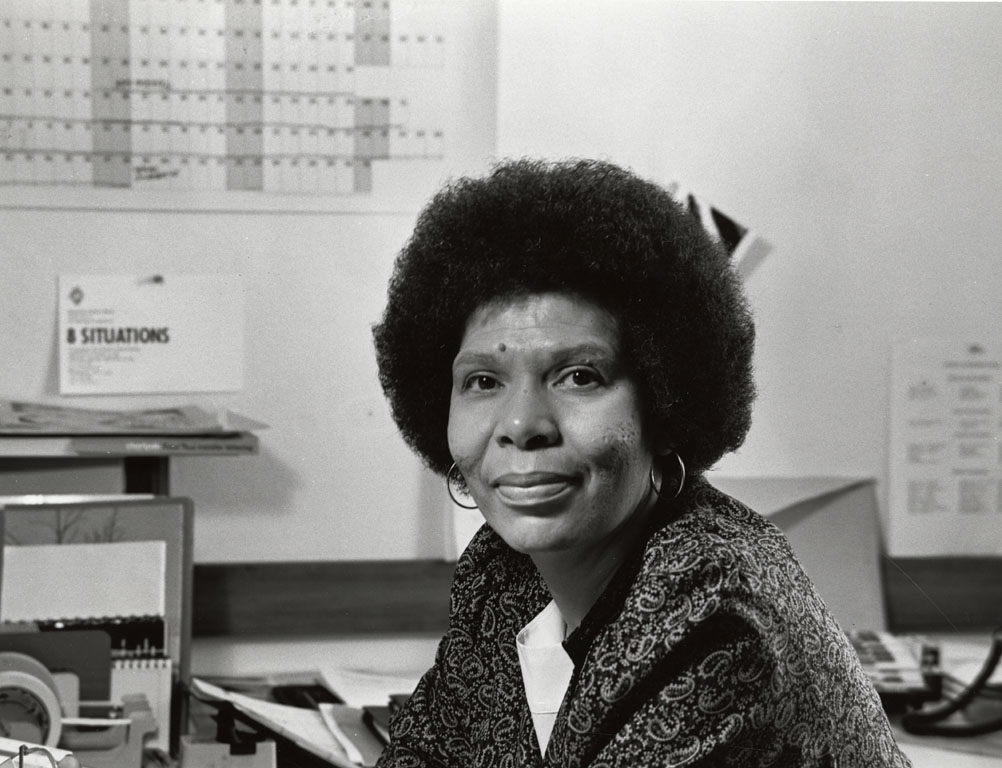
- Born: June 22, 1930; Allentown, Pennsylvania, U.S.
- Died: March 11, 2022 (aged 91); Silver Spring, Maryland, U.S.
- Occupation: Museum director

Zora Martin-Felton (sometimes written Zora Martin Felton or Zora Felton; June 22, 1930 – March 11, 2022) was an American museum director and curator. She established the education department at the Anacostia Community Museum, which is a museum in the Smithsonian Institution and worked as Director of Education from 1967 to 1995.

== Early life and education ==
Felton was born Zora Belle Martin June 22, 1930, in Allentown, Pennsylvania, to James Edward Martin and Elizabeth Cobbs Martin and was raised in Bethlehem, Pennsylvania, and attended Liberty High School. She attended Moravian College, where she graduated with a B.A. degree in 1952. This made her the first black student ever admitted to Moravian College. She obtained a master's degree in education from Howard University in 1980 and was a member of Delta Sigma Theta. Felton relocated to Washington, DC in 1958 and in 1975 she married the late Edward P. Felton, Jr.

== Career ==
=== Director and curator ===
Felton's first experience in museum work occurred when she was working at the Southeast Neighborhood House, which was a settlement house in Washington, D.C. She was asked by the Smithsonian Institution to survey community members to study the possibility of creating a community museum in Anacostia. That museum became the Anacostia Museum. In 1967, the Anacostia Community Museum opened under the umbrella of the Smithsonian Institution, becoming the first federally funded community museum in the United States. Felton was hired to direct the Education Department of the museum immediately after the museum was established, and she has been credited with establishing the Education Department. For nearly 30 years she was Assistant Director of the museum, and a 2020 article in the DCist described Felton as having been "director of the Smithsonian Anacostia Community Museum" during "the early 1990s". At the museum she worked closely with Louise Daniel Hutchinson.

In her educational role at the Anacostia Museum, Felton was responsible for curating a number of exhibits. One exhibit that she curated focused on the effects of the Norway rat in Anacostia. She also helped to create a nature trail, and a traveling division of the museum. Felton was also involved in the representation of African-American history at American museums and cultural sites.

In the early 1990s, Felton was instrumental in organizing day-long Juneteenth celebrations in Anacostia, which was a prominent step towards broader recognition of Juneteenth in Washington, D.C.

Felton retired from the Anacostia museum in 1995, becoming Education Director Emeritus.

=== Writing ===
Felton co-authored two books with Gail S. Lowe. They first wrote the 1976 book A walk through "Old" Anacostia, which documents the historical region of Anacostia. In 1993, they published A different drummer: John Kinard and the Anacostia Museum. The book is a biography of John Kinard, the founding director of the Anacostia Community Museum and the first African American director of a Smithsonian museum, who had died in 1989. A different drummer is also a history of the early Anacostia Museum, and its role in the surrounding community.

== Death ==
Felton died on March 11, 2022, at the age of 91. She was survived by three children and 14 grandchildren.

== Awards ==
In 1980, Felton was honored by Howard University for Outstanding Contributions to the Life and Culture of the Black Community. In June 1988, Felton was named one of America's Top 100 Black Business and Professional Women by Dollars & Sense magazine. In 1991, she received the EdCom Award for Excellence in Practice from the American Alliance of Museums. Felton was listed for many years in the Who's Who Among Black Americans, and was a winner of the Katherine Coffee Award. In 2009, the NAACP held a banquet for Felton and Constance Roberts Gates recognizing important firsts in education.
