= Ambassador Theater (Baltimore) =

Historic theater in Maryland, USA

- U.S. National Register of Historic Places
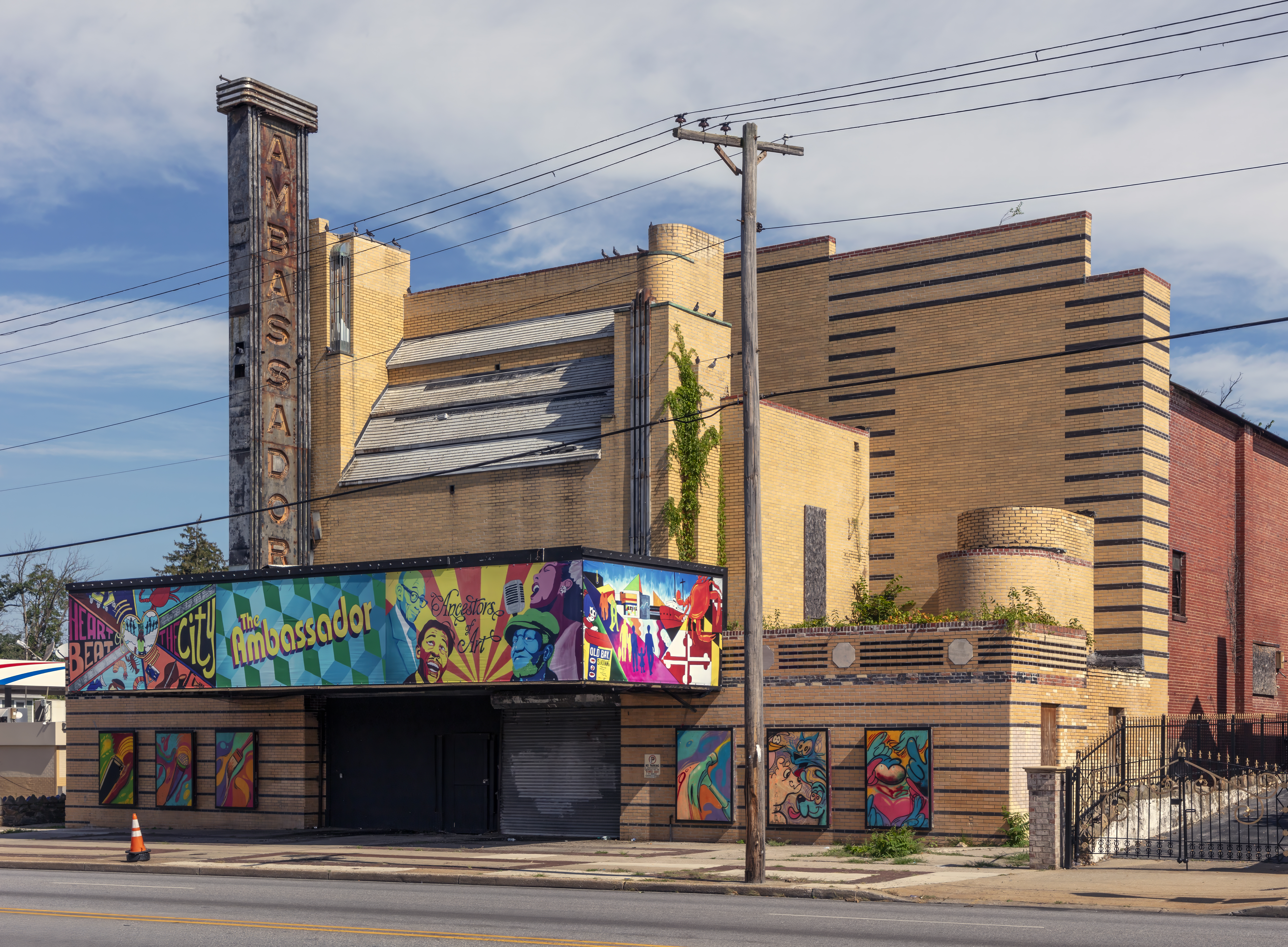
- Ambassador Theater in 2023

- Location within Baltimore Location within Maryland Location within the United States
- Location: 4604 Liberty Heights Ave., Baltimore, Maryland
- Coordinates: 39°19′53.1″N 76°41′41.3″W
- Area: less than 1 acre (0.40 ha)
- Built: 1935
- Architect: John Jacob Zink
- Architectural style: Streamline Moderne
- NRHP reference No.: 100008654
- Added to NRHP: February 27, 2023

The Ambassador Theater is a historic Streamline Moderne movie theater on Liberty Heights Avenue in the Howard Park section of Baltimore, Maryland. It is listed on the National Register of Historic Places and is a designated Baltimore City Landmark.

== History ==
The Ambassador was proposed in 1933 by F.H. Durkee Enterprises, who at the time operated the largest chain of movie theaters in Baltimore, at a site directly opposite the Gwynn Theater on Liberty Heights Avenue in the Howard Park neighborhood of Northwest Baltimore. After unsuccessful opposition from the owners of the Gwynn, the new theater was built in 1935. It was designed by John Jacob Zink, a prominent theater architect, and built by E. Eyring and Sons. It was at the time the most modern theater in Baltimore, superseded in 1939 by another Zink cinema, the Senator Theatre.

During the 1960s the Ambassador was a first-run cinema, showing movies immediately upon release, as opposed the second and third-run theaters more typical of the outer portions of Baltimore. However, it closed in October 1968, unable to compete with television. A month later, it reopened as a ballroom. A few years later it became a dinner theater, and in 1982 became a roller rink. Through this time it had been essentially unaltered.

In 1987 it was sold, and in 1989 became the Ron Thomas School of Cosmetology. In 2001 it was sold to the Zion Walls Power of God Ministries, and became a church. It became vacant in 2009, and was damaged by a 2012 fire that destroyed much of the interior.

In 2019 the Ambassodor was acquired by Artspace, a non-profit organization devoted to neighborhood performance and art. Artspace is preparing to restore the theater as a neighborhood cultural center.

During its time as a cinema, it was a regular destination for future movie director Barry Levinson, who went almost every week.

== Description ==
The Ambassador Theater is a large two-story brick auditorium with a ziggurat-like stepped facade organized around two vertical pylons. The Liberty Heights Avenue frontage is built of yellow brick, accented with contrasting horizontal brick striping. The western pylon holds the theater's sign. The theater is in the Streamline Moderne style, with prominent curves. The rounded forms and steps were originally emphasized by neon tubing. The theater's marquee extends the entire width of the front. A deep recess at the center forms the theater's entrance. Much of the lower facade originally incorporated Vitrolite panels, which has since been removed. The side and rear elevations are plain and utilitarian, in red brick.

The interior has been much altered as the theater's use has changed. The front entry opens into a two-story foyer space leading to the auditorium, extending upward behind the facade steps. Stairs to either side give access to the upper level, housed in flanking curved facade pylons There is no balcony, the second floor consisted of the projection booth and accessory space. The auditorium curved inwards toward the screen. There is a shallow stagespace behind the former screen location. Fire exits were provided at each corner, with passages leading back out to Liberty Heights Avenue.

Most of the interior finishes have been removed, including the auditorium ceiling. The curved proscenium frame survives. Fragments of Art Deco decoration have survived in some locations.

== Historic designation ==
The Ambassador was named a Baltimore City Landmark in 2016. It was placed on the National Register of Historic Places on February 27, 2023.
