= James Mayo =

James Mayo may refer to:

- Stephen Coulter (1914–1986), English writer, and, as James Mayo, the author of several spy and adventure thrillers
- James E. Mayo (1936–1995), American exhibition specialist
