= Atlas Performing Arts Center =

Arts centre in Washington, D.C.

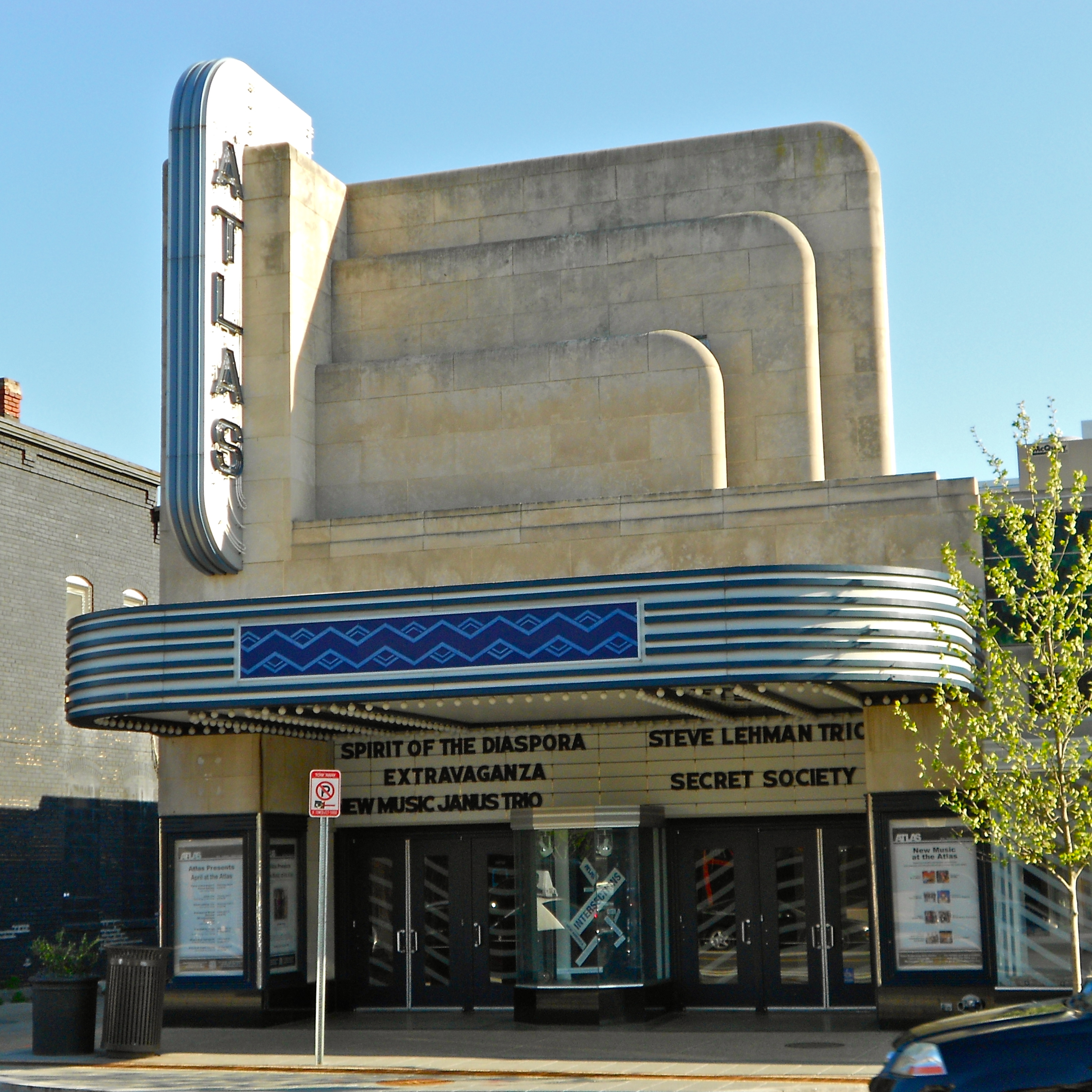
- Atlas Performing Arts Center in 2012
- Interactive map of Atlas Performing Arts Center
- Address: 1313-33 H Street, N.E. Washington, D.C. United States
- Capacity: Lang Theatre: 262; Sprenger Theatre: 170 - 200; Lab Theatre I: 70; Lab Theatre II: 80
- Current use: Performing arts center

Construction
- Opened: 1938
- Reopened: 2005
- Architect: John Jacob Zink

Website
- atlasarts.org
- Atlas Theater and Shops
- U.S. National Register of Historic Places
- D.C. Inventory of Historic Sites
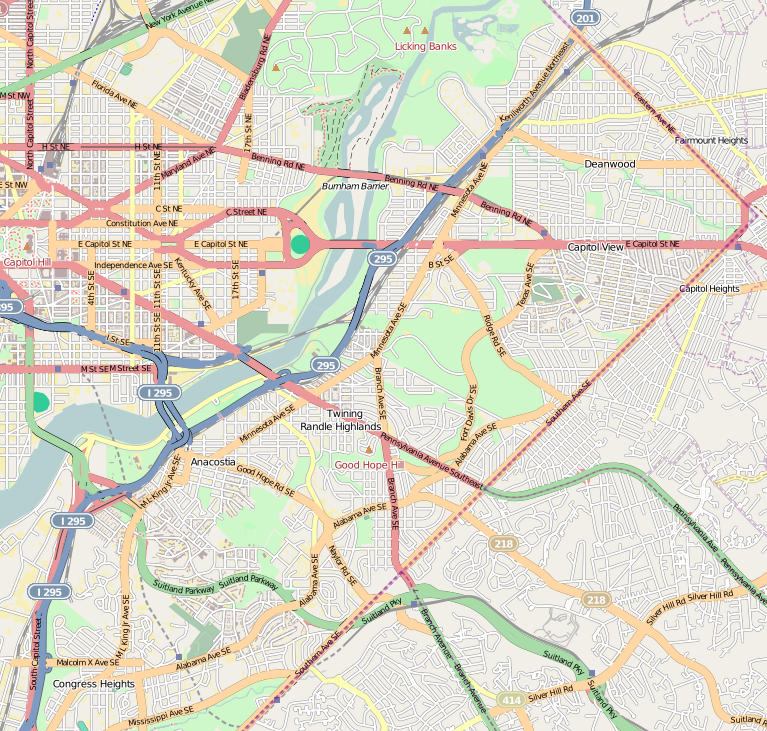
- Location within Washington, D.C. Location within the District of Columbia Location within the United States
- Coordinates: 38°53′59″N 76°59′15″W
- Architectural style: Art Moderne
- NRHP reference No.: 10000909

Significant dates
- Added to NRHP: November 10, 2010
- Designated DCIHS: October 24, 2002

The Atlas Performing Arts Center is a multiple space performing arts facility located on H Street in the Near Northeast neighborhood of Washington, DC. Housed in a renovated Art Deco movie house, the facility is home to several arts organizations.

== History ==
The Atlas Movie Theater was built in 1938 by the Kogod-Burka movie chain, one of four movie houses on the then-bustling commercial corridor. The riots of 1968 devastated the area and many businesses and residents abandoned H Street for the suburbs. The area became neglected with many empty buildings. The Atlas closed permanently in 1976. The H Street Community Development Corporation purchased the theater in 1985, and renovated the Art Moderne facade in 1989.

In 2001 The Atlas Performing Arts Center purchased the building from the H Street Community Development Corporation. In 2002, the Sprenger-Lang Foundation donated $450,000 of the $1.2 million asking price. The building was renovated for $22 million, beginning in 2004. The structure was completely gutted and three adjacent buildings were combined under one roof to house the current Arts Center. The Atlas Performing Arts Center opened in March 2005.

The nearly 60,000 square feet (5,600 m^{2}) facility includes one 260-seat proscenium theatre, one large flexible seat black box theatre and two smaller lab theatres. There are three dance studios, managed by Joy of Motion Dance Center. On the lower level there is a scene shop, seven dressing rooms, one green room and office space for the Atlas and its Resident Arts Partners. Jarrod Bennett has been the organization's executive director since 2024.

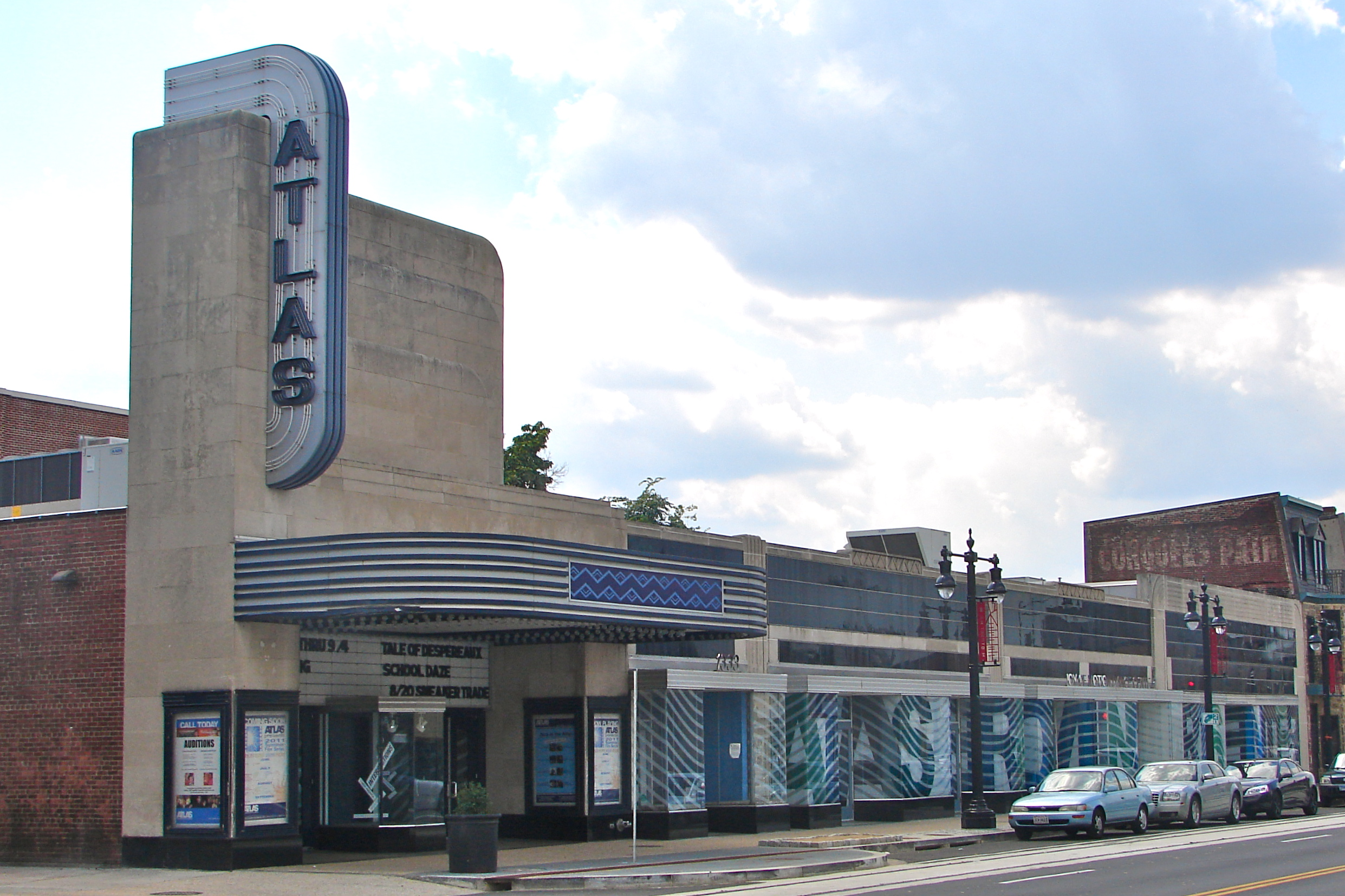
Theater and shops

== Atlas arts partners ==
- Capital City Symphony: Community orchestra based in Washington, D.C. The orchestra was founded in 1967 by Louis Fantasia as the Georgetown Symphony Orchestra. In 2006, the orchestra relocated from Georgetown to the Atlas. The group’s current name was adopted at the same time. It is one of the founding arts partners in the Atlas Performing Arts Center. Victoria Gau, the associate conductor of the National Philharmonic, has been serving as the Conductor and Artistic Director since as early as 2011. The previous conductors include Louis Fantasia, Daniel Hornstein, and John Welsh. CCS regularly accompanies gifted young performers from the Levine School of Music and the Novik Piano Competition.
- Joy of Motion Dance Center
- City at Peace
- Mosaic Theater Company of DC
- Visionaries of the Creative Arts (VOCA)

== Intersections ==
In the winter of 2010 the Atlas hosted its first arts festival, Intersections. Under the direction of artistic director Mary Hall Surface, the goal of the festival was to bring artists from different disciplines, ages and cultural backgrounds together under one roof to celebrate and explore the areas to make new connections and break new ground.

Over 5000 people came to the Atlas during the three weekends of the festival. The Atlas plans to host Intersections annually.

== See also ==
- National Register of Historic Places listings in the District of Columbia
- Theater in Washington D.C.
- Newton Theater
