= Melanie Adams =

American historian (born 1969)

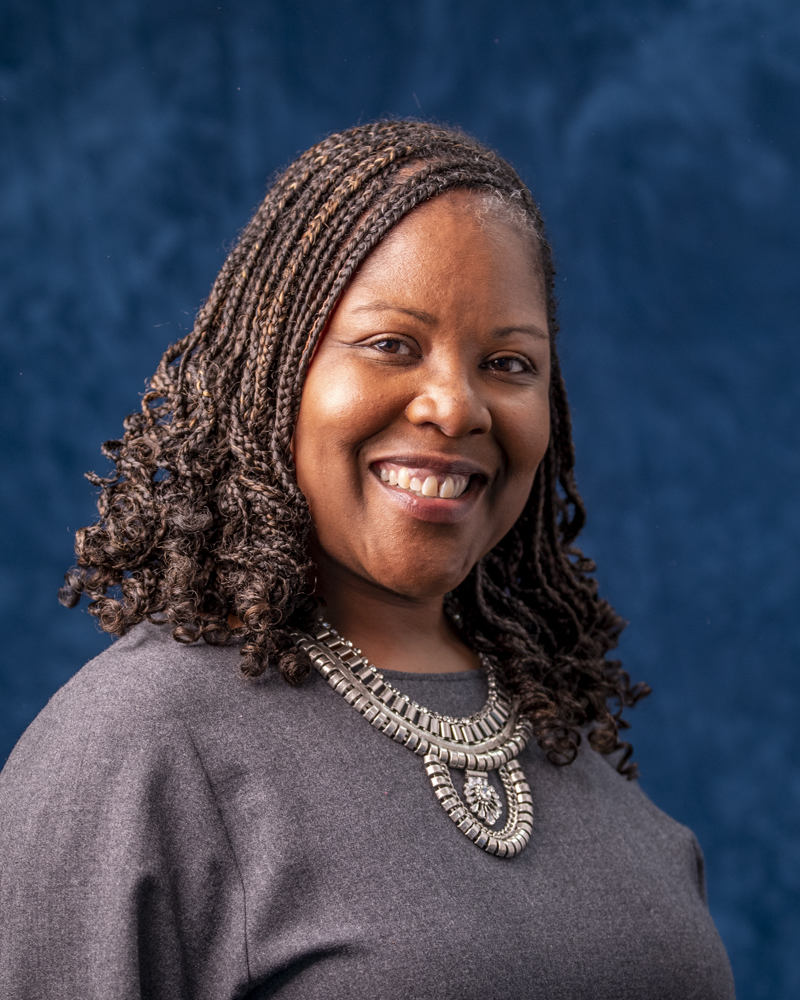
- Born: 1969 (age 56–57)
- Education: University of Virginia; University of Vermont; University of Missouri–St. Louis
- Occupation: Museum director
- Organization: Anacostia Community Museum

Melanie Adams (born 1969) is an American educator and museum administrator. She is director of the Anacostia Community Museum in Washington, D.C., a unit of the Smithsonian Institution, and was named interim director of the yet-to-open Smithsonian American Women's History Museum in July 2023. Before joining the Smithsonian, she worked for the Missouri Historical Society from 2005 to 2016 and was deputy director of the Minnesota Historical Society from 2016.

== Early life and education ==
Melanie A. Adams was born in 1969, the daughter of a teacher and a librarian, and she grew up in East Hanover, New Jersey.

Adams received a Bachelor of Arts degree in English and African-American studies from the University of Virginia. She went on to earn a Master of Education degree from the University of Vermont and a doctorate degree in educational leadership and policy studies from the University of Missouri–St. Louis. Her 2014 doctoral dissertation was titled "Advocating for Educational Equity: African American Citizens' Councils in St. Louis, Missouri from 1864 to 1927".

== Professional career ==
Adams began her career in higher education working in student affairs at the University of California-Berkeley and California State University-Northridge.

Adams moved to St. Louis, Missouri in 1997 after being offered a position in student affairs at Washington University. From 2002 to 2003, Adams served as the executive director for the St. Louis office of Teach for America. She worked as a consultant for community organizations until 2005, when she became managing director for community education and events at the Missouri History Museum; she worked for the Missouri Historical Society until 2016.

She joined the Minnesota Historical Society as deputy director in 2016. She brought her community engagement efforts to create a community outreach department to build relationships with local communities in each of the Society's 26 historic sites and museums.

Adams became director of the Anacostia Community Museum in August 2019, aspiring to create more community-based partnerships in that role.

== Professional leadership ==
She was appointed to the St. Louis Public Schools Special Administrative Board in 2007, working with the community to regain accreditation for the district. She served in that role for nine years.

She served as president of the Association of Midwest Museums from 2014 to 2016.

Adams is currently a member of the board of directors for the American Association for State and Local History.

== Notable awards ==
- St. Louis NAACP 100 Community Leader, 2009
- Royal Vagabonds Foundation Extraordinary St. Louis Trailblazer, 2014

== Bibliography ==
- Doyle, Amanda E.; Adams, Melanie A. (2017). Standing up for civil rights in St. Louis. St Louis: Missouri History Museum Press. ISBN 9781883982911. OCLC 979567909.
