= Newton Theater =

- U.S. National Register of Historic Places
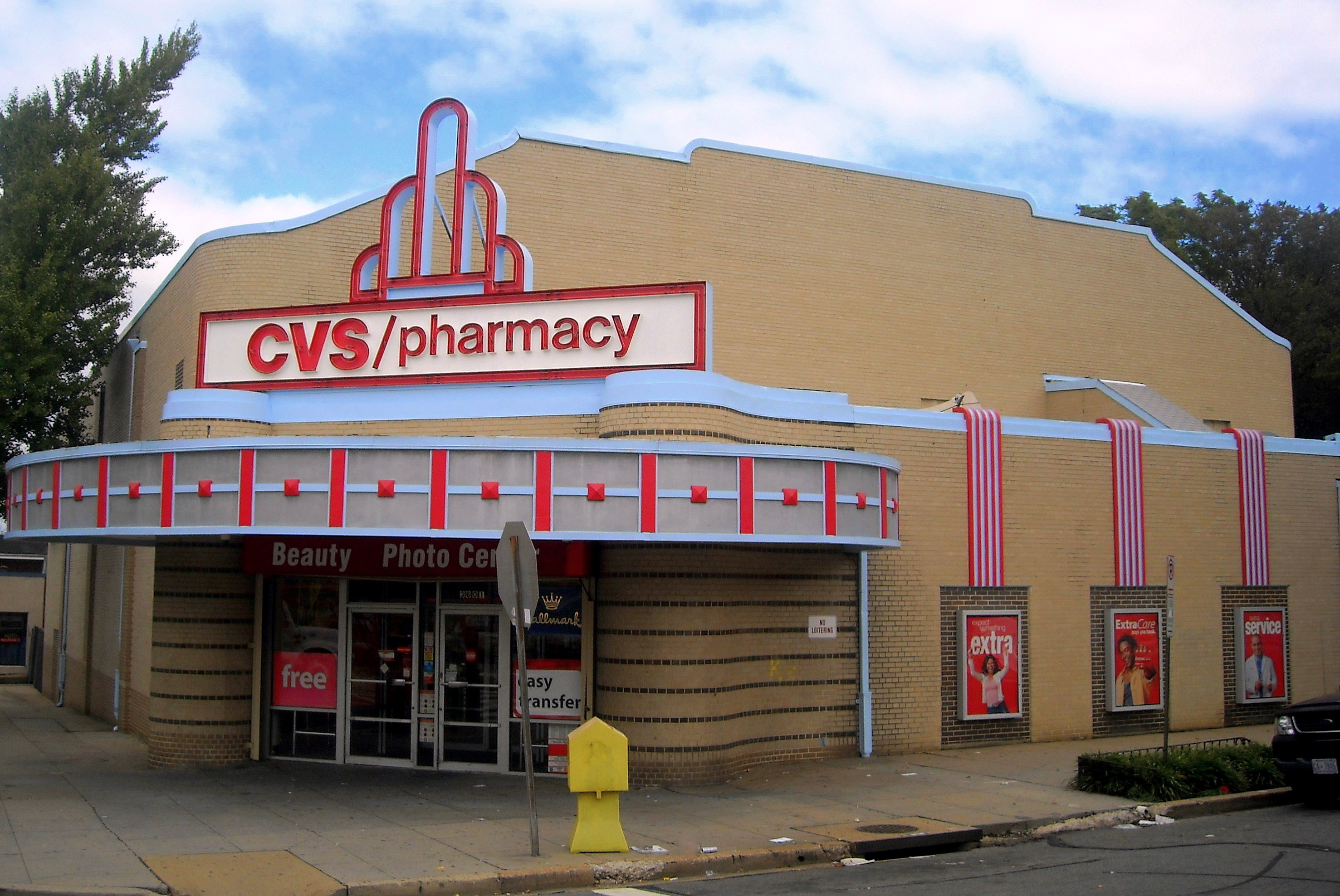
- Building of former Newton Theater (2008)

- Location within Washington, D.C.
- Location: 3601 12th Street, N.E., Washington, D.C.
- Coordinates: 38°56′8″N 76°59′27″W
- Built: 1937
- Architect: John Jacob Zink
- Architectural style: Art Deco
- NRHP reference No.: 07000592

The Newton Theater was a movie theater located at 3601 12th Street, Northeast, Washington, D.C., in the Brookland neighborhood. The Art Deco building was designed by John Jacob Zink and opened on July 29, 1937. Zink is credited with more than 200 movie theater projects in this region. The first film shown at the Newton Theater was I Met Him in Paris, starring Claudette Colbert and Robert Young.

After the theater closed in the mid-1960s, the Catholic University of America purchased the building and used it until 1971. The Newton Theater resumed screening films in the late 1970s, under the ownership of the Brookland Community Corporation, but that, too, ended in 1979. The theater hosted punk rock concerts throughout 1984, featuring bands like Hüsker Dü, Government Issue, Negative Approach, Void, Iron Cross, 9353, Honor Role, and Malefice. The Newton Theater was placed on the National Register of Historic Places in 2007.

In the 1990s, the theater was converted to a Peoples Drug store; CVS later bought and rebranded the chain. CVS kept many of the Art Deco exterior features, including the marquee, ziggurat and sign which was changed to "CVS/pharmacy."

== See also ==
- National Register of Historic Places listings in the District of Columbia
- Theater in Washington D.C.
- Atlas Theater and Shops
