= Banneker-Douglass-Tubman Museum =

Historic church in Maryland, United States

- Mt. Moriah African Methodist Episcopal Church
- U.S. National Register of Historic Places
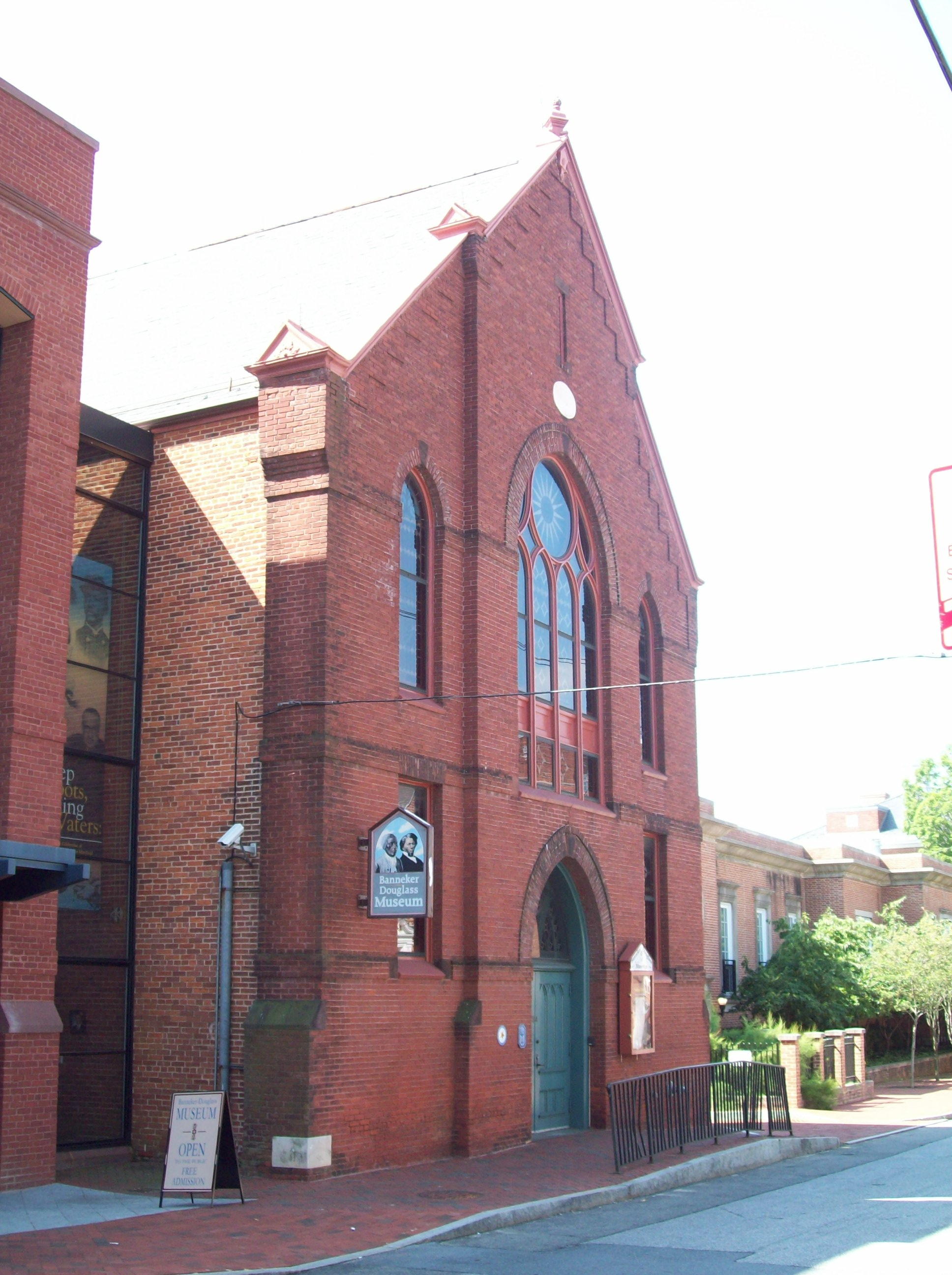
- Banneker-Douglass Museum, July 2009

- Location within Maryland Location within the United States
- Location: 84 Franklin St., Annapolis, Maryland
- Coordinates: 38°58′39.2″N 76°29′37.1″W
- Built: 1874
- Architectural style: Gothic
- NRHP reference No.: 73000891
- Added to NRHP: January 25, 1973

The Banneker-Douglass-Tubman Museum, formerly known as the Banneker-Douglass Museum, is the state of Maryland's official museum for African American history and culture. Located at 84 Franklin Street, Annapolis, Anne Arundel County, Maryland, the museum is housed within the former Mt. Moriah African Methodist Episcopal Church.

The museum is named for notable Maryland figures Benjamin Banneker, Frederick Douglass, and Harriet Tubman. The facility serves as the state's official repository of African American material culture. The 11,700 square foot facility is home to 12,000 historical objects, the Sylvia Gaither Garrison Library and archives, permanent and temporary history and art exhibits, and performance space. Lectures, workshops, performances, and educational programs are offered in-person and virtually throughout the year.

The structure of Mt. Moriah African Methodist Episcopal Church was constructed in 1875 and remodeled in 1896. It is a 2 1/2-story, gable-front brick church executed in the Gothic Revival style. It served as the meeting hall for the First African Methodist Episcopal Church, originally formed in the 1790s, for nearly 100 years. It was leased to the Maryland Commission on African-American History and Culture (MCAAHC), becoming the state's official museum for African American history and culture in 1984. In 1984, a 2 1/2-story addition was added to the rear of the building when it opened as the Banneker-Douglass Museum.

It was listed on the National Register of Historic Places in 1973 and is within the boundaries of the Colonial Annapolis Historic District. Steven Newsome is the former director of the museum. Chanel C. Johnson is the current executive director of the museum and MCAAHC.

== Collection and exhibits ==
The life and contributions of famous African American Maryland residents are highlighted in the permanent exhibition Deep Roots, Rising Waters: A Celebration of African Americans in Maryland, including Kunta Kinte, Benjamin Banneker, Frederick Douglass, Harriet Tubman, Matthew Henson, Carr's Beach, Gloria Richardson, and Thurgood Marshall. Other exhibits include black life in Maryland, and African, and African American art.

Featured exhibitions and living history performances at the museum included “Highland Beach: The First One Hundred Years”, “In His Own Words: The Life and Work of Frederick Douglass”, “The Life of Harriet Ross Tubman”, and "The Radical Voice of Blackness Speaks of Resistance and Joy".

== History ==
=== 1970s ===
The MCAAHC presented study results to the Governor suggesting the need for a permanent museum on Maryland's African American heritage. In 1972, MCAAHC and community leaders saved Mt. Moriah AME Church from demolition. The Banneker-Douglass Museum Foundation, Inc. was established in 1976 and the Friends of Banneker-Douglass Museum was established in 1978.

=== 1980s ===
Mt. Moriah AME Church is dedicated as the Banneker-Douglass Museum of Afro-American Life and History on February 24, 1984, as Maryland's official state museum on African American history and culture.

=== 2000s ===
In 2005, a $5.2 million capital building and permanent exhibit expansion was completed at the museum adding a modern wing, which was the result of a partnership between the African American community and state and local governments. The large-scale modern building expansion allowed the museum to better service a greater percentage of the heritage tourism market already visiting historic Annapolis and by expanding the African American tourism segment of that market. The expanded facility included a new permanent exhibit, revolving exhibit space, and a library for public use. The library opened within the museum to collect and make available resources that document and elucidate Maryland's African American heritage.

The Banneker Douglass Museum celebrated its 25th anniversary in February 2009. Governor Martin O’Malley rededicated the former Mt. Moriah African Methodist Episcopal (A.M.E.) house of worship. The Banneker-Douglass Museum celebrated the first anniversary of its library and archives in honor of Sylvia Gaither Garrison on October 27, 2009. In addition to her roles as Bates High School teacher, Fulbright Scholar, librarian, church leader, sorority sister, and community activist, Garrison was the central force behind the establishment of the Museum's library.

=== 2020s ===
On Tuesday, April 9, 2024, Governor Wes Moore signed bills HB390/ SB341 into law, actualizing the historic change from the Banneker-Douglass Museum to the Banneker-Douglass-Tubman Museum. The name change honors the legacy of Harriet Tubman, the iconic abolitionist, suffragist, and humanitarian, alongside Benjamin Banneker and Frederick Douglass.

In November 2024, the museum was renamed to the Banneker-Douglass-Tubman Museum in a ceremony with poet, author, and activist Nikki Giovanni as the keynote, and attendance of Governor Wes Moore, First Lady Dawn Moore, Ernestine Wyatt (3x Great-Grandniece of Harriet Tubman), and many other notables figures.

== See also ==
- List of museums focused on African Americans
