= Steven Newsome =

American museum administrator

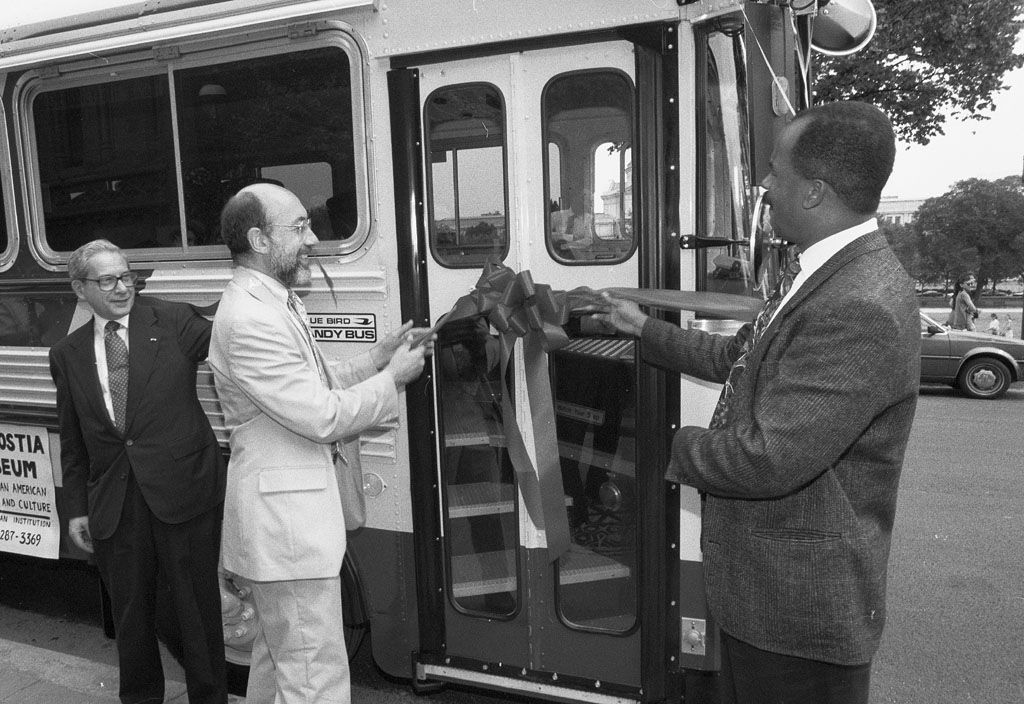
Steven Newsome (right) with Acting Smithsonian Under Secretary Alan Fern in 1992.

Steven Newsome (1952–2012) was an American arts and museum administrator. Newsome grew up in Norfolk, Virginia. He attended Trinity College, Hartford and Emory University. He is the former Chief of the Office of Cultural and Educational Services in the Division of History and Cultural Program at the Department of Housing and Community Development, in Annapolis, Maryland. He was Executive Director of the Maryland Commission on Afro-American History and Culture and director of the Banneker-Douglass Museum. In 1990 he became the director of the Anacostia Museum, before retiring in 2004. Newsome was the founding director of the Prince George's African American Museum & Cultural Center.

Newsome died September 27, 2012. He was survived by his daughter, Sanya Newsome, and two granddaughters. A public tribute was held 2 December 2012 at the Arena Stage in Washington, D.C.
