= Lorenzo Dow Turner =

American sociolinguist (1890–1972)

- Born: August 21, 1890; Elizabeth City, North Carolina, U.S.
- Died: February 10, 1972 (aged 81); Chicago, Illinois, U.S.
- Education: Howard University; University of Chicago
- Occupations: Academic and linguist
- Known for: Research on the Gullah language

Lorenzo Dow Turner (August 21, 1890 – February 10, 1972) was an African-American academic and linguist who did seminal research on the Gullah language of the Low Country of coastal South Carolina and Georgia. His studies included recordings of Gullah speakers in the 1930s. As head of the English departments at Howard University and Fisk University for a combined total of nearly 30 years, he strongly influenced their programs. He created the African Studies curriculum at Fisk, was chair of the African Studies Program at Roosevelt University, and in the early 1960s, cofounded a training program for Peace Corps volunteers going to Africa.

== Early life ==
Born in Elizabeth City, North Carolina, on October 21, 1890, Turner was the youngest of four sons of Rooks Turner and Elizabeth Freeman. His father completed his master's degree at Howard University, although he had not begun first grade until he was twenty-one years old. His mother gained the education allowed to black women at the time (six years). Two of Turner's brothers earned degrees in medicine and law.

== Academic career ==
Turner earned a bachelor's degree from Howard University in 1914, a master's degree from Harvard in 1917 and a Ph.D. in English literature from the University of Chicago in 1926. He taught at Howard University from 1917 to 1928, and during his last eight years, he served as Head of the English Department. After leaving Howard, he founded the Washington Sun newspaper, which closed after one year. He also taught Zora Neale Hurston when she was a student at Howard University. In her autobiography Dust Tracks on a Road, Hurston described him as a major influence on her.

From 1929 to 1946, Turner served as Head of the English Department at Fisk University. There, he designed the curriculum for the African Studies Program. Turner had a lasting interest in linguistics and specifically phonology; in 1930 and 1931 he studied at the Linguistic Society of America's third and fourth Linguistic Institute at the City College of New York, then became the first Black member of the LSA in 1931 and joined other organizations such as the American Dialect Society and the International Phonetic Association. He was the first of the prominent American Black linguists, followed by Mark Hanna Watkins, Joseph Applegate, Beryl Loftman Bailey and Raleigh Morgan Jr. (Turner's student).

In 1946, he began teaching at Roosevelt University in Chicago, where he was chair of the African Studies Program. In the early 1960s, he cofounded the Peace Corps training program to prepare young volunteers for service in Africa. He retired from Roosevelt in 1967, at the age of 77.

Turner remained professor emeritus at Roosevelt until his death in 1972. His papers are held in the Anacostia Community Museum in Washington, DC.

In 2026 Oliver Mayeux analyzed recordings from Turner of Louisiana Creole and Louisiana French speakers. The recordings were contextualized and the identities of the speakers (previously unknown) were reconstructed.

== Gullah research ==
Lorenzo Dow Turner is best remembered as the father of Gullah studies. His interest in the Gullah people began in 1929, when he first heard Gullah speakers while teaching a summer class at South Carolina State College (now University). Although established scholars then viewed Gullah speech as a form of substandard English, Turner sensed that Gullah was strongly influenced by African languages. He set out to study the language. For the next 20 years, he made trips to the Gullah region in coastal South Carolina and Georgia, interviewing Gullahs (often in isolated locations) and making detailed notes on their language. He also made recordings in the 1930s of Gullah speakers talking about their culture, folk stories and other aspects of life.

As part of his studies, Turner traveled to several locations in Africa, specifically Sierra Leone, to learn about the development of Creole languages, as well as to Louisiana and Brazil, to study Louisiana Creole and Portuguese, respectively. He had made recordings of Creole speakers during his fieldwork in Louisiana, but never analyzed them; this work was done in 2026 by Oliver Mayeux.

Turner studied at the University of London School of Oriental and African Studies in 1936 and then did fieldwork in Brazil and West Africa, researching various African-language systems. He wanted to be able to provide context for the obvious "Africanisms" he discovered in his Sea Islands research. "Such depth and breadth allowed Turner to locate Gullah culture and language within the broader complexities of the African diaspora in the New World, [...] firmly outside the reductionist theoretical model of cultural assimilation."

When Turner published his classic work Africanisms in the Gullah Dialect in 1949, he made an immediate impact on established academic thinking. His study of the origin, development, and structure of Gullah, as well as the analysis of the continuity of language and culture across the diaspora were so convincing that scholars quickly accepted his thesis that Gullah is strongly influenced by African languages. Many scholars have followed Turner over the years in researching the African roots of Gullah language and culture. Turner created a new field of study with by his work.

Turner was strongly influenced by the American linguistic movement, which he joined at its inception. Through his Gullah research, he gave shape to several academic specialties: Gullah studies, dialect geography, and creole linguistics, as well as being a predecessor to the field of African-American studies, which developed in the 1960s and ′70s.

Turner's work was the subject of Word, Shout, Song: Lorenzo Dow Turner Connecting Communities Through Language at the Anacostia Community Museum in July 2016. Exhibit curator Alcione Amos said the Washington, D.C., museum acquired many of Turner's original notes, pictures and recordings from his widow, Lois Turner Williams, in 2003.

Turner died of heart failure at Michael Reese Hospital in Chicago, Illinois, on February 10, 1972, aged 81.

== Legacy ==
A junior high school in Chicago, the Turner Drew Language Academy, was dedicated to him (and to Charles Drew, an African-American scientist who invented a technique for storing blood).

== Sources ==
- Wade-Lewis, Margaret (1988). Lorenzo Dow Turner: First African-American Linguist. Philadelphia: Temple University Department of African-American Studies.
- Wade-Lewis, Margaret (2007). Lorenzo Dow Turner: Father of Gullah Studies. Columbia, South Carolina: University of South Carolina Press. ISBN 978-1-57003-628-6.
