= KB Theatres =

Washington, D.C. area movie theatre chain that went out of business

- Type: Private
- Industry: Entertainment (movie theatres)
- Founded: 1926 in Washington, D.C.
- Headquarters: Washington, DC
- Key people: Fred S. Kogod, Founder; Max Burka, Founder

KB Theatres (a.k.a. KB Cinemas) was a Washington, D.C. area movie theatre chain that went out of business in January, 1994.

== History ==
Fred S. Kogod and Max Burka were the founders, and the K and B of the chains name. European immigrants, and brothers-in-law, the duo were successful in the grocery and real-estate business in the 1920s, before starting the chain. The first theater purchased by the company was the Princess Theater in 1926, which came as part of a larger real-estate buy. Their second theater, The Atlas located at 1331 H Street NE, Washington, D.C., was built by the company and opened in 1938 and closed in 1976.

The chain closed abruptly in January, 1994 with little warning to the community or employees. 10 of 15 theaters were sold to an investor partnership. Several KB locations were taken over by Cineplex Odeon.
