= Camille Akeju =

American curator and educator

Camille Giraud Akeju is American curator and educator. She is the former director of the Anacostia Community Museum in Washington, D.C.

== Biography ==
Camille Akeju grew up in Mount Vernon, New York. She attended college in Jacksonville University, in 1968, and was one of six students to be integrated in the dorms. She ended up leaving Jacksonville and attended Howard University, where she earned a bachelor's degree in art education, a minor in printmaking, and her master's degree in art history. While at Howard, she would intern at the Smithsonian Museum of American Art.

After graduation, Akeju worked briefly as professor at Fisk University. She married a fellow professor, who was born in Nigeria. The couple would live in Nigeria for two years and then move back to Mount Vernon. Upon their return, she started working at the Association of Community-Based Artists of Westchester Center for the Arts. Akeju then worked, for seven years, at the Mind-Builders Creative Arts Center in the Bronx. She was the president and CEO of the Harlem School of the Arts for six years. She also worked at the New York Transit Museum. In 2006, she became the director of the Anacostia Community Museum. In 2014, while in this role, Akeju gave a lecture at the Hunt Museum in Limerick in partnership with the Irish Museums Association.
