= James E. Mayo =

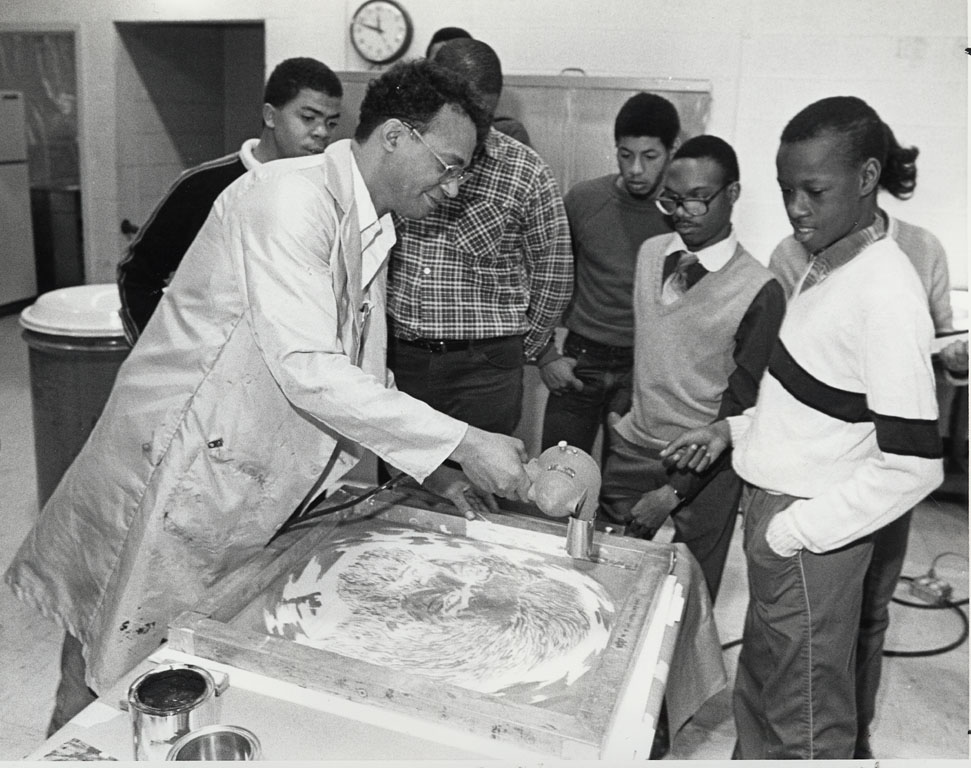
Mayo explains the silk-screen process to a group of prevocational trainees from the D.C. Association for Retarded Citizens, at the Anacostia Community Museum, 1985.

James E. Mayo (1936-1995) was an American exhibition specialist. He held this role at the Anacostia Community Museum, where he also was co-director.

== Personal life and education ==
James Mayo was born and raised in Washington, D.C. After he graduated from Cardozo High School, he joined the workforce, starting his career, in 1959, at the National Museum of American History. He would marry, which would end in divorce.

== Career ==
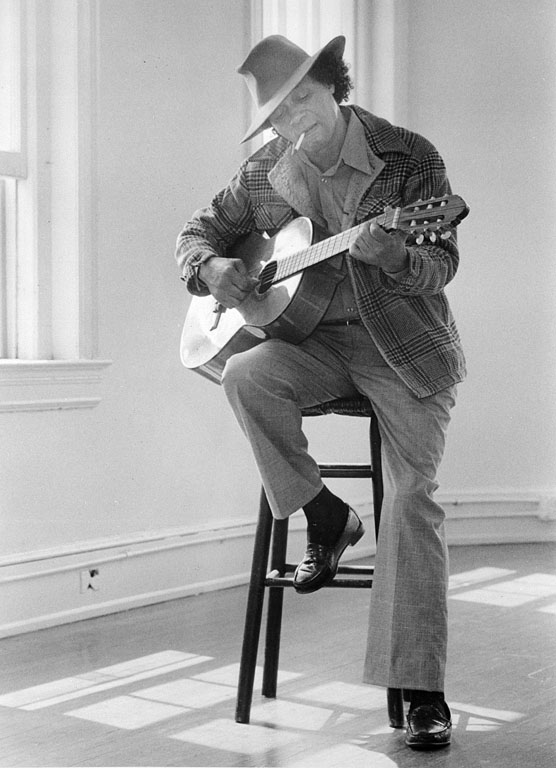
James "Jim" Mayo, supervisory exhibits specialist at the Anacostia Museum, playing a cowboy in the Capitol Hill Arts Workshop production of "Bus Stop."

Upon joining the National Museum of American History, Mayo took on the role of exhibitions production supervisor. He would go on to also design exhibitions for Dumbarton Oaks and the City University of New York. He also ran the renovation of the Benjamin Brown French School and was chairman of the board at the Market 5 Gallery, both in Washington, D.C.. He co-founded the Erika Thimey Dance and Theater Company. While at the Anacostia Community Museum, he worked on exhibitions such as Blacks in the Westward Movement and Black Women: Achievement Against the Odds, alongside Louise Daniel Hutchinson. He retired in September, 1994, as director emeritus. His exhibition style was described as "elegant" in The Art Museum as Educator.

== Later life and legacy ==
James E. Mayo died on July 13, 1995, at George Washington University Hospital of lung cancer. A scholarship named in his honor is awarded by the Erika Thimey Dance and Theater Company.
