= Carver Theater (Washington, D.C.) =

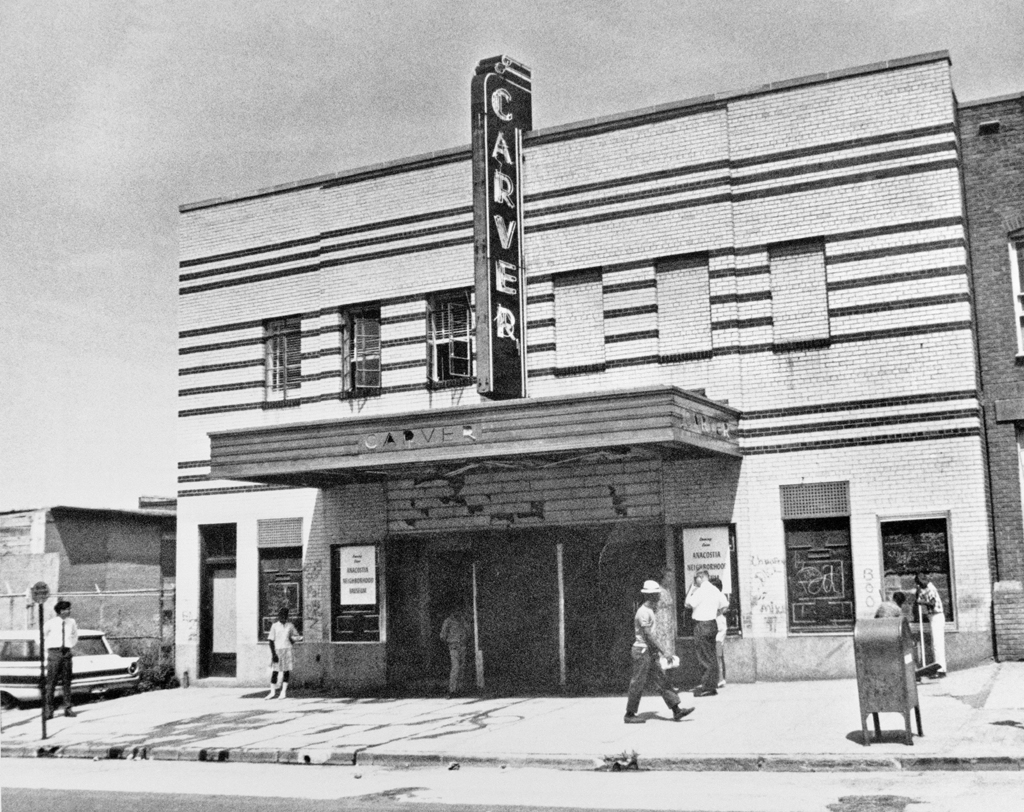
- Carver Theater just before it opened as the Anacostia Community Museum, 1967

- Location within Washington, D.C.

General information
- Type: Office
- Location: Washington, D.C., United States
- Coordinates: 38°51′46″N 76°59′34″W
- Completed: 1948

Design and construction
- Architect: John Jacob Zink

The Carver Theater is a former movie theater located in the Anacostia neighborhood of Washington, D.C. in the United States.

== History ==
The building opened in 1948 and is of the Streamline Moderne style of architecture. It was built by John Jacob Zink and held upwards of 500 people seated. The Carver Theater closed in the 1960s only to reopen in 1967 as the first home of the Anacostia Community Museum. The museum moved from the theater in 1987.

Currently, the theater is undergoing renovations to serve as a training center for the Good Samaritan Foundation, a non-profit organization founded by Art Monk. In 2001, the city of Washington agreed to a 20-year lease with the organization. As of 2008, the building has undergone few renovations. Almost $1 million has been invested in the building through grants and donations. In 2004, the city sold the building to the foundation for $255,235 in the hope they would "restore and reoccupy Carver Theater."
