= Intersections (arts festival) =

INTERSECTIONS: A New America Arts Festival
- Genre: Jazz; Theater; Dance
- Dates: Late February—Early March, Washington, D.C.
- Years active: 2010—Present
- Website: Official Intersections DC website

The cross cultural arts festival known as INTERSECTIONS: A New America Arts Festival is a music, theater and dance festival held annually in Washington, D.C.

== Description ==
It is held on the weekends around the spring equinox. All performances are presented within the restored Atlas Performing Arts Center in D.C. The festival consists of 12 days of performing and visual arts celebrating the diversity, energy and excellence of artists and audiences from Washington, D.C. and beyond.

The subtitle for the festival is “Where Arts Merge and Cultures Meet.”

It was conceived and established in 2010 under the guidance of Jane Lang, and was curated by Mary Hall Surface, who continues to serve as the Festival Artistic Director. Major support for INTERSECTIONS is provided by the FIRE Fund of The Community Foundation of the National Capital Region, designed to promote interracial understanding and collaboration.
