= John Jacob Zink =

American architect

- Born: June 1, 1886; Baltimore, Maryland
- Died: August 15, 1952 (aged 66)
- Education: Maryland Institute, Columbia University
- Occupation: Architect
- Buildings: Uptown Theater, Newton Theater, Atlas Theater and Shops, Senator Theatre

John Jacob Zink (1886–1952) was an American architect who designed movie houses in Washington, D.C., and Baltimore.

== Life ==
He studied at the Maryland Institute (now known as Maryland Institute College of Art), and graduated in 1904. He apprenticed with Wyatt and Nolting and William H. Hodges. In the evenings he studied at the Columbia School of Architecture and worked with architect Thomas W. Lamb. He worked for Ewald G. Blanke, a famous Baltimore architect, from 1916 to 1924. Their firm of Blanke and Zink was located at 835 Equitable Building in Baltimore City.

In the early 1920s, he started his own design firm. He was a Streamline Moderne architect. Employing modest designs, he concentrated on details, such as views, lighting and acoustics. He incorporated such amenities as nurseries, lounges and smoking rooms.

== Works ==
- 1921 Century Theatre, Baltimore, MD
- 1923 Takoma Theater, Takoma Park, MD
- 1926 Colony Theater, Washington, D.C.
- 1926 Tivoli Theatre (now Weinberg Center for the Arts), Frederick, MD
- 1930 Patterson Theater, Baltimore, MD

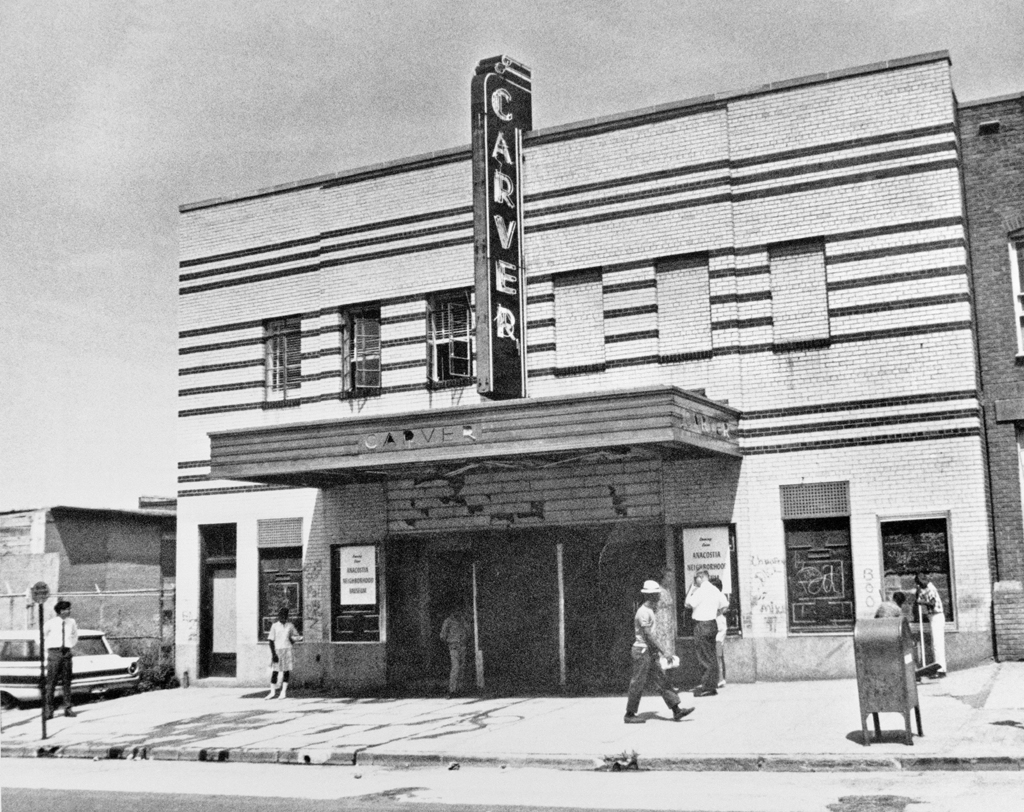
Carver Theater just before it opened as the Anacostia Community Museum, 1967

- 1932 Grandin Theatre, Roanoke, VA
- 1935 Ambassador Theater, Baltimore, MD
- 1936 Uptown Theater, Washington, D.C.
- 1937 Newton Theater, Washington, D.C.
- 1938 Atlas Theater and Shops, Washington, D.C.
- 1939 Senator Theatre, Baltimore, MD
- 1939 Congress Theater, Washington, D.C.
- 1940 Apex Theater, Washington, D.C.
- 1940 Village Theater, Washington, D.C.
- 1942 Senator Theater, Washington, D.C.
- 1945 Langston Theater, Washington, D.C.
- 1945 Commodore Theater, Portsmouth, VA
- 1946 Naylor Theater, Washington, D.C.
- 1948 Carver Theater, Anacostia, Washington, D.C.
- circa late 1940s Capital Theatre, Annapolis, MD
- 1950 Flower Theatre, Silver Spring, MD
- 1952 Langley Theatre, Langley Park, MD
