= Uptown Theater (Washington, D.C.) =

- Uptown Theatre
- U.S. National Register of Historic Places
- U.S. Historic district – Contributing property
- D.C. Inventory of Historic Sites
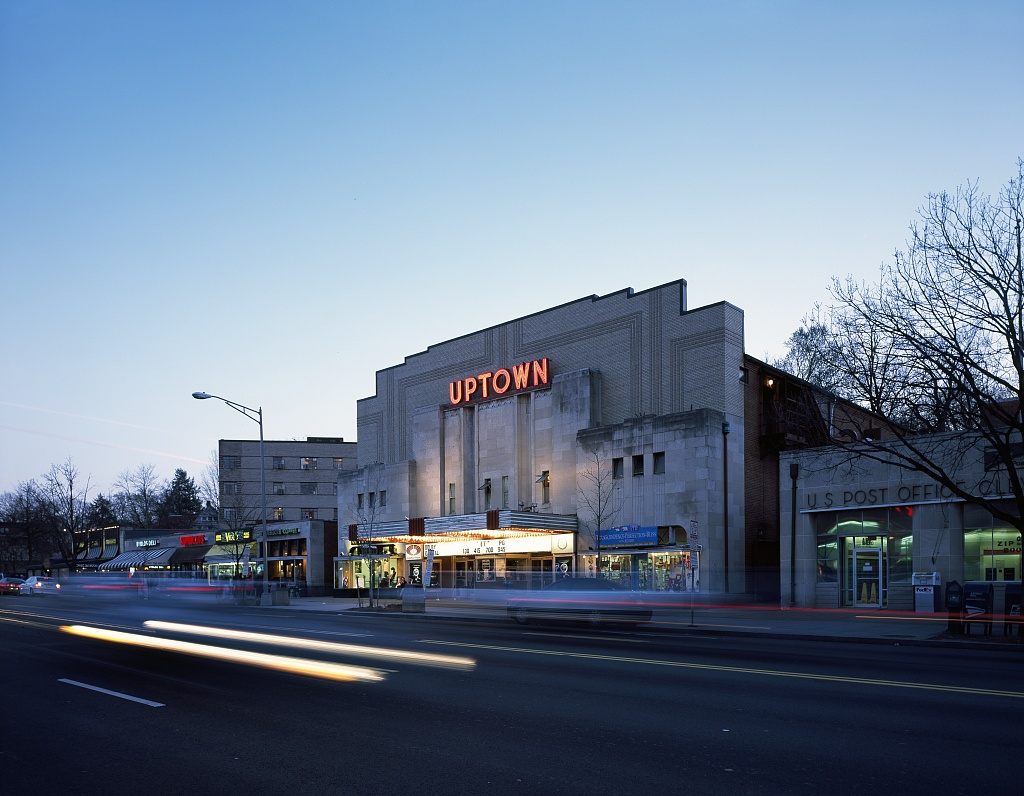
- The theater, with Cineplex Odeon signage, from across Connecticut Avenue, c. 2000

- Location within District of Columbia Location within the United States
- Location: 3426 Connecticut Avenue NW, Washington, D.C., United States
- Coordinates: 38°56′06″N 77°03′30″W
- Built: 1936
- Architect: John Jacob Zink
- Architectural style: Art Deco
- Part of: Cleveland Park Historic District (ID87000628)
- NRHP reference No.: 100008461

Significant dates
- Added to NRHP: December 15, 2022
- Designated CP: April 27, 1987
- Designated DCIHS: May 26, 2022

The Uptown Theater, (Note: Sometimes spelled "Uptown Theatre") known as The Uptown (formerly Cineplex Odeon Uptown and AMC Loews Uptown 1), was a single-screen movie theater in the Cleveland Park neighborhood of Washington, D.C. Opened in 1936, it hosted the world premieres of such movies as 2001: A Space Odyssey and Jurassic Park. It closed in March 2020.

Its screen was the largest commercial movie theater screen in the DC metro area outside of the Smithsonian Institution. The building was listed on the National Register of Historic Places in 2022.

== History ==
Opened on October 29, 1936, the theater was designed by architect John Jacob Zink, whose firm designed over 200 theaters across the United States, and the 14th built by Warner Brothers in Washington, D.C. The exterior is constructed of yellow and red brick and the facade is partially faced in limestone fluted panels. The limestone features typical Art Deco motifs, including zigzag patterns and floral reliefs. The marquee includes streamlined aluminum bands. The main entrance to the theater is below this marquee. Two one-story storefronts flank the theater entrances.

The Uptown has a curved screen, 70 by 40 feet (21 by 12 m), one of the largest in the area. The theater originally seated 1,120, but a $500,000 renovation in 1996 decreased capacity to 850. Nothing remains of the original decor.

In December 2010, the theater's Norelco 35mm/70mm projector was dismantled and replaced with a Christie Dual-Projector 3D system for the opening of Tron: Legacy.

In March 2020, as movie theaters across the country were temporarily closing due to the outbreak of the COVID-19 pandemic, AMC Theatres announced the permanent closure of the 84-year-old theater, as AMC's lease on the space was about to expire.

In October 2021, officials with Landmark Theaters confirmed reports that they were in negotiations to lease and reopen the theater.

In May 2022, the D.C. government's Historic Preservation Review Board voted 7-0 to add the theater to the D.C. Inventory of Historic Sites and to nominate it for addition to the National Register of Historic Places. In December 2022, the NRHP listed it among the week's additions.

The theater was sold in October 2024 to Sandro Kereselidze and Tatiana Pastukhova, the married owners of the Artechouse computer-art space. The new owners announced plans to remodel the theater as an arts venue.

== Film premieres ==
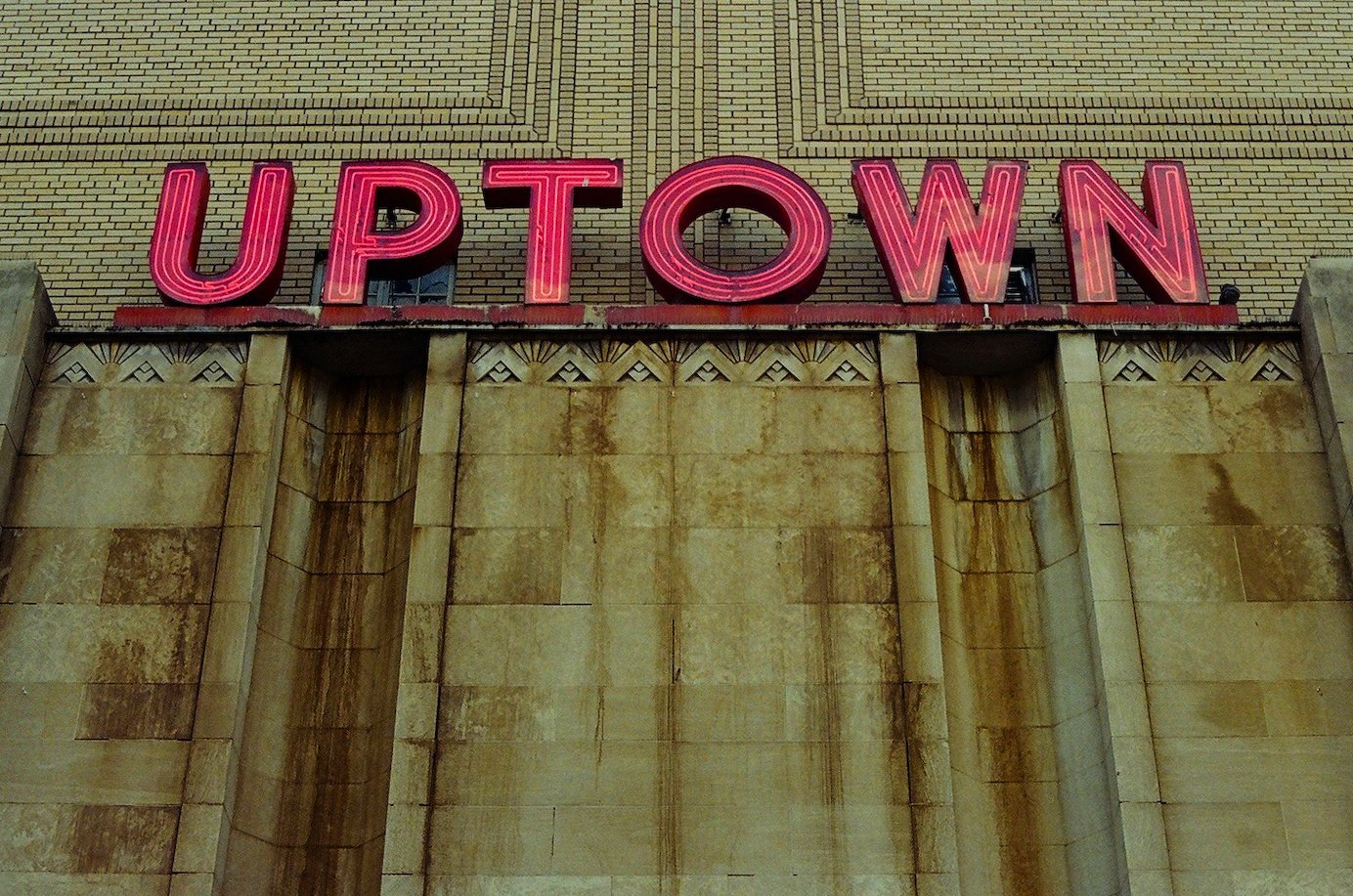
Detail of Uptown Theater sign

- World premiere of 2001: A Space Odyssey on April 2, 1968. The release was presented in a 70mm projection format with a six-track stereo magnetic soundtrack. Following this screening, director Stanley Kubrick cut almost 20 minutes from the film's running time.
- On June 26, 1973, Jesus Christ Superstar had its world premiere.
- One of the first 32 houses to play Star Wars on its opening day (Wednesday, May 25, 1977) in 35mm with a 4-track stereo soundtrack. The theater also started playing the film in the 70mm projection format with a 6-track Dolby Stereo magnetic soundtrack on December 16 of the same year.
- On October 3, 1979, one of only three theaters to screen director Francis Ford Coppola's Apocalypse Now in Six-Track Dolby Stereo, which showcased a then-new quintaphonic split-surround audio mix. The film was shown without opening or closing credits or any studio logos; instead, a program was handed out to moviegoers.
- Mississippi Burning held its world premiere at the Uptown on December 2, 1988, with various politicians, ambassadors and political reporters in attendance.
- Madonna attended the world premiere of Dick Tracy on June 10, 1990.
- World premiere of Dances with Wolves on October 19, 1990. During the screening, the projector broke down twice.
- World premiere of Jurassic Park on June 9, 1993.
- The Guardian, starring Kevin Costner and Ashton Kutcher, on September 7, 2006.
- Lions for Lambs, starring Robert Redford, Tom Cruise, and Meryl Streep and directed by Redford, on November 7, 2007.
