= Senator Theatre =

- U.S. National Register of Historic Places
- Baltimore City Landmark
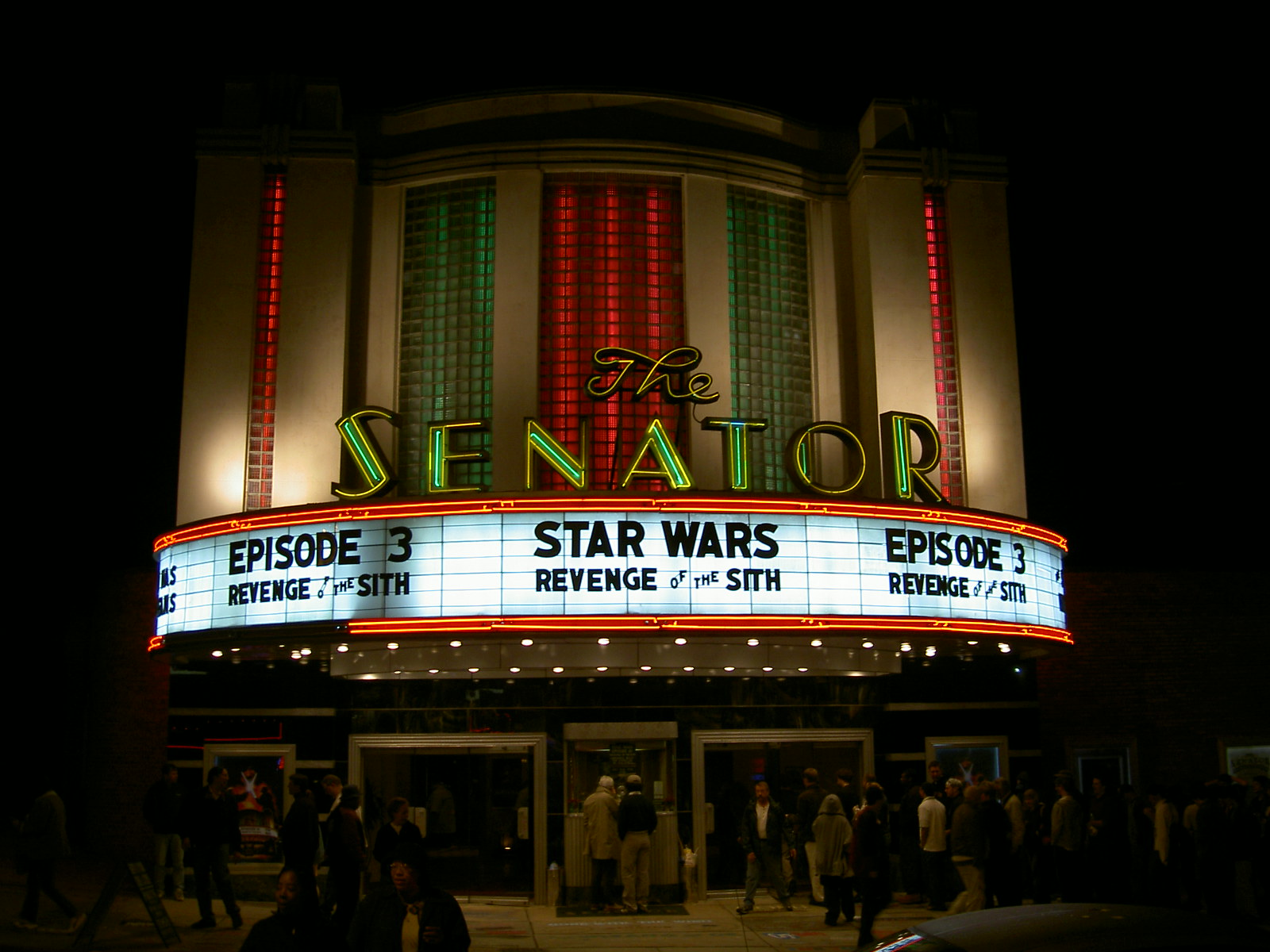
- Senator Theater, May 2005
- Interactive map of Senator Theatre
- Location: 5904-5906 York Rd., Baltimore, Maryland
- Coordinates: 39°21′49″N 76°36′39″W
- Area: less than one acre
- Built: 1939
- Architect: Zink, John J.; Et al.
- Architectural style: Art Deco
- NRHP reference No.: 89001153

Significant dates
- Added to NRHP: August 24, 1989
- Designated BCL: 2007

The Senator Theatre is a historic Art Deco movie theater on York Road in the Govans section of Baltimore, Maryland. It is the oldest operating movie theater in central Maryland and is listed on the National Register of Historic Places and is a designated Baltimore City Landmark.

Managers Buzz and Kathleen Cusack renovated the theater and reopened it on October 15, 2010. The theater closed again for more renovations on April 26, 2012. It has since reopened, with three smaller theaters adjacent to the main one. It shows first run movies as well as classics.

== Architecture ==
The Senator Theatre is an Art Deco landmark built by E. Eyring for Durkee Enterprises at an original cost of $250,000. It opened to the public October 5, 1939. The first movie it featured was Stanley and Livingstone, starring Spencer Tracy and Nancy Kelly. The architect, John Jacob Zink, designed the Senator with a circular upper structure of glass blocks and limestone. Multicolored backlighting of the glass block was added to produce a dramatic effect at night.

The lobby still features the original terrazzo floors, and art deco murals about the history of performing arts. A massive gold curtain still opens to dramatically reveal the screen before each performance. The theatre's interior is accented by a back lit sun-burst at the apex of the screen, and rainbow prisms in the recessed ceiling. "Originally, it had 1150 seats but that has gone down to 900."

The Senator Theatre also has two skyboxes for private parties. They are connected by a mezzanine overlooking the outer lobby and can host up to 40 people.

The sidewalk in front of the theatre features a ‘walk of fame’ which highlights local cinematic accomplishments.

The Senator Theater was added to the National Register of Historic Places in 1989.

The Baltimore City Commission for Historical and Architectural Preservation (CHAP) designated the Senator Theatre as an "exterior" Baltimore City Landmark in 2007. It further designated the interior of the Senator Theatre as another Baltimore City Landmark on June 24, 2011.

== Technical specifications ==
The Senator Theatre boasts a massive, modern 40 ft curved screen, state of the art projection systems, and Dolby Digital sound with surround EX. Today, the Senator Theatre mainly showcases first run movies. It is able to screen films in 35mm or 70mm. Equipment includes a Bauer U2 projector with top-of-the-line German lenses.

In 2003, the Senator was selected to become the first venue to complete the Historic Cinema Certification Program offered by THX Ltd., the San-Rafael, California based company founded by George Lucas. The special skyboxes are also equipped with user-controlled digital sound.

The snack bar offers traditional movie house snacks, and freshly popped, hot popcorn, with real butter upon request. Tickets are now $9 each.

== Reputation ==
Many celebrities have attended movie premieres, fundraisers, and screenings at the Senator. They include: Matt Damon, Matthew McConaughey, John Travolta, Joaquin Phoenix, Salma Hayek, and Edward Norton.

The Senator Theatre's facade has been featured in many movies and commercials. It was featured prominently in the cult film Cecil B. Demented, which showcased historic theatres around Baltimore. The theatre can also be seen in the movies Twelve Monkeys, Diner, and Avalon. The Senator was also featured prominently in Mario's 2002 music video "Just a Friend."

Directors John Waters and Barry Levinson premiere most of their films at the Senator. It often hosts East Coast premieres of films shot in and around Baltimore, including Ladder 49, Runaway Bride and The Accidental Tourist. The theatre also showcases films starring Baltimore area natives like Edward Norton and Jada Pinkett Smith.

Several books feature the Senator Theatre, including Cinema Treasures, Popcorn Palaces, Exit: A History of Movies in Baltimore and Motion Picture Exhibition in Baltimore: An Illustrated History and Directory of Theatres.

- The August 5, 2005, issue of Entertainment Weekly Magazine ranked the Senator Theater fourth on the list of “10 Theaters doing it right... movie houses that make watching films a dream”.
- In its September 29, 2003, edition, USA Today declared the Senator Theatre to be one of America's best “Places to see a classic cinema”.
- In 2001, the National Trust for Historical Preservation designated the Senator as America's quintessential independent historic movie house.

On May 19, 2003, the National Main Street Center of the National Trust for Historic Preservation honored owner Tom Kiefaber with the “2003 Business Leadership Award”. The award was “in recognition of his tireless advocacy for historic, independent movie theaters".

== Fundraisers ==
The Senator Theatre routinely hosts special events that have raised millions of dollars for local charities.

- Each December, the Senator holds an annual Holiday Classics Series on the large screen as a means of raising donations of food and cash to the Maryland Food Bank. "It's a Wonderful Life" and "A Christmas Carol" are usually shown.
- On February 22, 2007, the Senator Theatre hosted an American Heart Association Go Red for Women campaign fundraiser starring Gretchen Wilson.

== Special screenings ==
The Senator Theatre has been the site of extended camp-outs where diehard fans await tickets for premieres of epic movie offerings, including series like Star Wars, Lord of the Rings, and Harry Potter. It is also the place where Maryland's big media franchises typically go to cover movie openings, and interview hardcore fans. The theatre has also hosted midnight shows of fan favorites such as the Star Wars movies.

The Senator Theatre has been used as a venue within Maryland Film Festival.

The Senator also hosts free screenings classic films in cooperation with community enrichment initiatives.

- The 1928 silent comedy classic "Speedy" starring Harold Lloyd was screened on February 19, 2007. It was accompanied by live music from Alloy Orchestra as part of Loyola College's 2007 Humanities Symposium.
- A free screening of "To Kill a Mockingbird" (1962) starring Gregory Peck was held on Saturday, March 24, 2007.

== Recent struggles ==
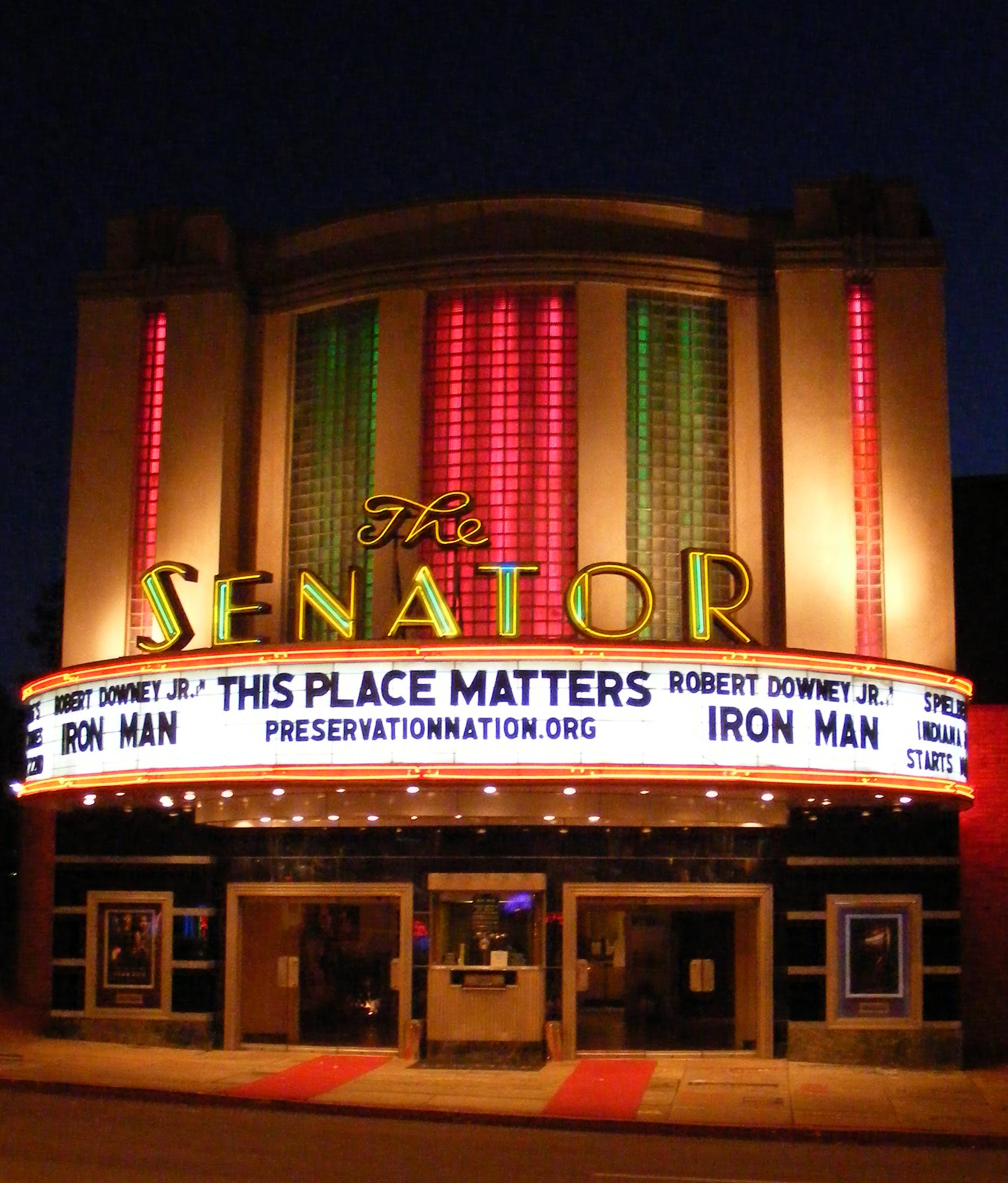
Senator Theatre with 2008 marquee

The Senator theatre was scheduled to be auctioned on February 21, 2007. The auction was avoided due to $109,000 (USD) in donations through a grassroots campaign.

The Senator's struggles have been attributed to a practice known as “clearance“. Movie "clearing" or blocking occurs when rival theatres, usually multiplexes, invoke agreements with distribution houses to exclude a nearby theatre from ever concurrently running the same films that are running on any of their screens. The Senator's former owner, Tom Kiefaber explained: "We eventually overcame the (rival multiplexes') clearance, but without equal access to the first-run lifeblood of the film exhibition industry during that difficult period, we were forced to accumulate debt that is a continuing detriment to the economic viability of The Senator Theatre.“ The good news is that "if we are able to avert the auction sale...our district will soon become a ’free zone’ and the primary impediment to our profitability, a restrictive film clearance...by an independent Baltimore multiplex... will soon come to a blessed end.“

"(O)ur well-established, activist, anti-film clearance position (has been) outlined... in the national, [but alas not local] media coverage we have received over the years on the subject... in The New York Times, U.S. News & World Report, Forbes Small Business Magazine, USA Today, CBS Sunday Morning, and ABC News among others."

The Senator Theatre ceased showing first run movies on March 15, 2009. According to their website, "Senator Theatre management has announced that the screening of Watchmen on Sunday evening, March 15th, was the final first-run film to be shown at the renowned theatre in its 70 year history." It was revealed the theatre was again facing possible foreclosure.

On March 16, 2009, a town hall meeting was held by the local neighborhoods to rally support to save the Senator Theatre from the pending foreclosure and make it into a cultural center. No general agreement could be made to determine an effort in moving forward in the community's efforts to save the theatre. Attendees were told to wait a few more days as the neighborhood trust releases more details.

The Baltimore Sun noted the following on March 17, 2009: "The Senator Theatre stopped selling tickets Sunday night, as owner Tom Kiefaber unexpectedly closed the financially troubled movie house."

The City of Baltimore bought the mortgage to the Theatre in May 2009, and purchased the property (essentially from itself) at auction on July 23, 2009.

New owners have renovated the theater and plan additional renovations following its scheduled October 15, 2010, reopening. These include an additional screen, a small-plate restaurant, and a bar inside the lobby. They have uncovered original wooden paneling in the lobby's rotunda.

The Senator closed in September 2012, and reopened on October 10, 2013, with a screening of Baltimore local John Waters' classic movie Hairspray.
