= John Kinard =

American museum director (1936–1989)

John Robert Edward Kinard
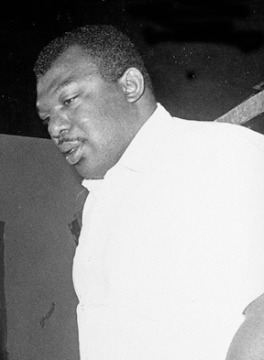
- Born: November 22, 1936; Washington, D.C., U.S.
- Died: August 5, 1989 (aged 52); Washington, D.C., U.S.
- Occupation: Museum director
- Spouse: Marjorie Anne Williams Kinard

John Robert Edward Kinard (November 22, 1936 – August 5, 1989) was an American social activist, pastor, and museum director. He is best known as the director of the Anacostia Museum, a small community museum founded by the Smithsonian Institution in 1967. Kinard was the museum's first director, and remained in the post until his death. The Washington Post said Kinard was "a passionate believer in the idea that the well-being of black people depends on having a record of their past". Noted British archeologist and museologist Sir Kenneth Hudson said Kinard "developed the Anacostia Museum into one of the small number of museums of influence in the world."

== Early life ==
Kinard was born in November 1936 in Southeast, Washington, D.C. to Robert Francis and Jessie Beulah (Covington) Kinard. He had a brother, William. Kinard attended Dunbar High School but transferred and then graduated from Spingarn High School in 1955. He attended Howard University in Washington, D.C., for a year and a half, but transferred to Livingstone College in Salisbury, North Carolina. He graduated with a bachelor's degree in 1960. He subsequently enrolled at Hood Theological Seminary (then part of Livingstone College, but now a separate institution), earning a Bachelor of Divinity degree in 1963.

In 1962, while attending Hood Theological Seminary, he joined Operation Crossroads Africa (a progenitor of the Peace Corps) and spent a summer building student housing and dining facilities in Tanzania. Dr. James Herman Robinson, founder of Operation Crossroads, encouraged him to return to Africa. Kinard did so after graduation, becoming a paid staff member of the organization. He worked in Kenya, Tanzania, and Zanzibar. He was later promoted to coordinator of all Operation Crossroads projects in eastern Africa (a region ranging from Cairo in the north to Zimbabwe in the south).

Kinard returned to Washington, D.C., in 1964. He became a counselor with the Neighborhood Youth Corps, a program established by the Economic Opportunity Act of 1964 to provide work experience for at-risk African American youth and encourage them to stay in school. He also worked for Southeast Neighborhood House, an organization founded by Dr. Dorothy Ferebee to provide medical care and other services to poor African Americans living in Southeast Washington, D.C.

Kinard married Marjorie Anne Williams on November 1, 1964. The couple had three daughters: Sarah, Joy, and Hope.

== Director of the Anacostia Museum ==
In 1966, Kinard was appointed assistant pastor at John Wesley African Methodist Episcopal Zion Church in Washington, D.C.

After leaving Operations Crossroads Africa, Kinard joined the Office of Economic Opportunity, but quickly moved to the United States Department of State where he worked as an interpreter and escort for visiting African government officials. While at the State Department, Kinard became friends with the son of Marion Conover Hope. Hope was a member of the Greater Anacostia People's Corporation, a group which was advocating for improved cultural institutions in the impoverished areas of Washington, D.C., east of the Anacostia River.

S. Dillon Ripley, Secretary of the Smithsonian Institution, began pushing in 1966 for a new and innovative kind of Smithsonian museum. Ripley conceived of a neighborhood or "storefront" museum that would be small, interactive, and focused on neighborhood issues. The Greater Anacostia People's Corp. had persuaded Ripley to put the first such neighborhood museum in Anacostia. The abandoned Carver movie theater on Nichols Avenue SE (now Martin Luther King Jr. Avenue SE) was renovated and turned into the new museum. Hope met Kinard through her son, and convinced Kinard to speak with Charles Blitzer, director of the Smithsonian's Office of Education and Training. Blitzer was deeply impressed by Kinard, and asked him to meet with Ripley. When Kinard walked into Ripley's office, Ripley thanked him for taking the job. Shocked, Kinard nonetheless agreed to become the Anacostia Museum's director. He later recalled, "I thought, what the hell. Everybody ought to take a leap once in their lives—just jump and not know where they'll land."

Kinard was named director of the Anacostia Museum in July 1967. He held the position until his death in 1989.

Under Kinard's leadership, the Anacostia Museum had 35 major exhibitions in its first eight years. One of the early exhibitions, "Frederick Douglas, the Sage of Anacostia, 1817?–1895", was chosen to tour the United States by the Smithsonian Institution Traveling Exhibit Service. Kinard's vision for the Anacostia Museum was that it could not be divorced from the problems of the neighborhood around it. The exhibit "Lorton Reformatory: Beyond Time" highlighted the fact that many young African American men from the Southeast Washington were incarcerated at the prison, and documented their life there. Another exhibit, "The Rat: Man's Invited Affliction", looked at the way rats have taken advantage of human living conditions to thrive and spread. It identified ways in which people living in the Anacostia area could get rid of rats living in their homes. It also included live rats running through part of the exhibit. The museum later curated major exhibits on the problems of crime, the illegal drug trade, poor housing conditions, and lack of quality education in African American communities.

In 1978, Kinard helped co-found the African American Museum Association (AAMA), an umbrella group which represented small local African American art, cultural, and history museums across the United States. He was its treasurer in 1982–1983, and its president in 1987–1988. When a National Museum of African American History and Culture was being pushed in Congress during his term as president of the AAMA, Kinard strongly opposed the plan. He argued that a national museum would consume donor dollars and out-bid local museums for artifacts and trained staff. Kinard and the AAMA demanded that Congress establish a $50 million fund to create a national foundation to support local black history museums as a means of mitigating these problems. Kinard would change his mind back and forth several times over the next two years. But shortly before he died, he told The Washington Post that he had come to strongly support the museum effort. "My vision is that the Smithsonian Institution ought to take the lead in developing a national African American museum on the Mall. This is a critical thing. This is a life and death thing. Why do people shoot each other in the head, man? Because they don't have respect for human life. Because they don't have a respect for history that they can know and understand. They don't share a knowledge of history of America for themselves."

Although not trained in history or museum curatorship, Kinard was well known as a museum director. Tom Freudenheim, assistant secretary for museums at the Smithsonian Institution, said that under Kinard "the Anacostia Museum served as a model for a growing number of African American museums around the country—indeed for other ethnically oriented museums as well."

== Death and legacy ==
Kinard suffered from myelofibrosis, a disease in which bone marrow cells become abnormal and create collagenous connective tissue fibers rather than new bone marrow. Although he had been heavy-set most of his life, Kinard lost 60 pounds (27 kg) in the last few months of his life. He died on August 5, 1989, at Greater Southeast Community Hospital in Washington, D.C.

In an interview shortly before he died, Kinard delivered his own epitaph. "I believe it's God's will that I'm here. I'm a servant, and I follow. So when I shuffle off this mortal coil, if it can be said of me that 'he was a good servant,' that will be enough. Just to be a good servant is all I aspire to be."

Livingstone College established the John R. Kinard Scholarship for Leadership and Academic Excellence in his honor. The program awarded roughly $20,000 in scholarships in 2010.

== Bibliography ==
- Alexander, Edward P. (1997). The Museum in America: Innovators and Pioneers. Walnut Creek, Calif.: Rowman & Littlefield, Alta Mira Press. ISBN 978-0-585-18989-5.
- Douthis, Johnnie. "John R. Kinard, 1936-1989." Washington History. 1:2 (Fall 1989).
- Ruffins, F. D. (1998). "Culture Wars Won and Lost, Part II: The National African-American Museum Project". Radical History Review. 1998 (70): 78–101. doi:10.1215/01636545-1998-70-78.
- Smithsonian Opportunities for Research and Study in History, Art, Science. Office of Fellowships and Grants. Smithsonian Institution. Washington, D.C.: Smithsonian Institution Press, 1983.
