= Louise Daniel Hutchinson =

American historian

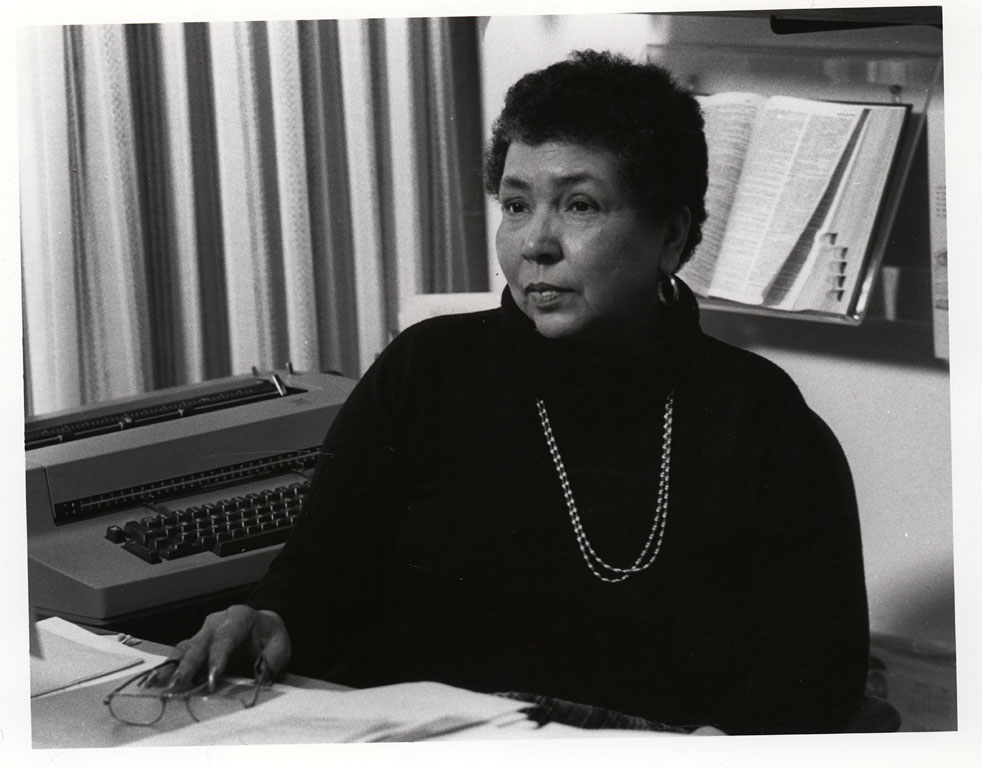
- Louise Daniel Hutchinson, at the Anacostia Community Museum, seated in her office, 1983.
- Born: June 3, 1928; Ridge, Maryland
- Died: October 12, 2014 (aged 86)
- Education: Miner Teachers College, University of the District of Columbia, Prairie View A&M University
- Alma mater: Howard University
- Writing career
- Genre: non-fiction
- Subject: history
- Notable work: Anacostia Community Museum
- Literary movement: Civil Rights Movement

Louise Daniel Hutchinson (June 3, 1928 – October 12, 2014) was an American historian. She was the former Director of the Research at the Anacostia Community Museum. Growing up in Washington, D.C., Hutchinson was exposed to the Civil Rights Movement and the importance of community. Hutchinson worked closely with the African American community of Washington, D.C., and staff at the Smithsonian Institution to help build the Anacostia Community Museum. She was a historian of the Anacostia community.

== Biography ==
=== Early life and education ===
Louise Daniel Hutchinson was born in Ridge, Maryland, to Victor Daniel and Constance Eleanor (nee Hazel), but was raised in the Shaw neighborhood of Washington, D.C. Her parents were both educators, leading the Cardinal Gibbons Institute, a Black Catholic school built on the model of Tuskegee. Her mother was an acquaintance of William Henry Hastie, Mary McLeod Bethune and Carter G. Woodson. Both parents were also active in local African American affairs, including civil rights activities. As a young person, Louise attended the Brown v. Board of Education court proceedings in Kansas.

She was educated at her parents' school before attending a number of different colleges, including Miner Teachers College (now known as University of the District of Columbia), Prairie View A&M University, and Howard University. It was from the latter that she earned her bachelor's degree in 1951. At Howard, she studied under Ralph Bunche, John Hope Franklin and E. Franklin Frazer. Soon thereafter, she married Ellsworth W. Hutchinson, Jr. and they had six children. She also worked as a substitute teacher.

=== Career ===
==== The Smithsonian ====
Hutchinson started working as a researcher at the National Portrait Gallery (NPG) in 1971. She researched African American portraits, such as the legacy of John Brown, and also worked on the exhibition The Black Presence in the Era of the American Revolution. The following year, she became an Education Research Specialist, where she worked on partnership projects between the museum and D.C. Public Schools.

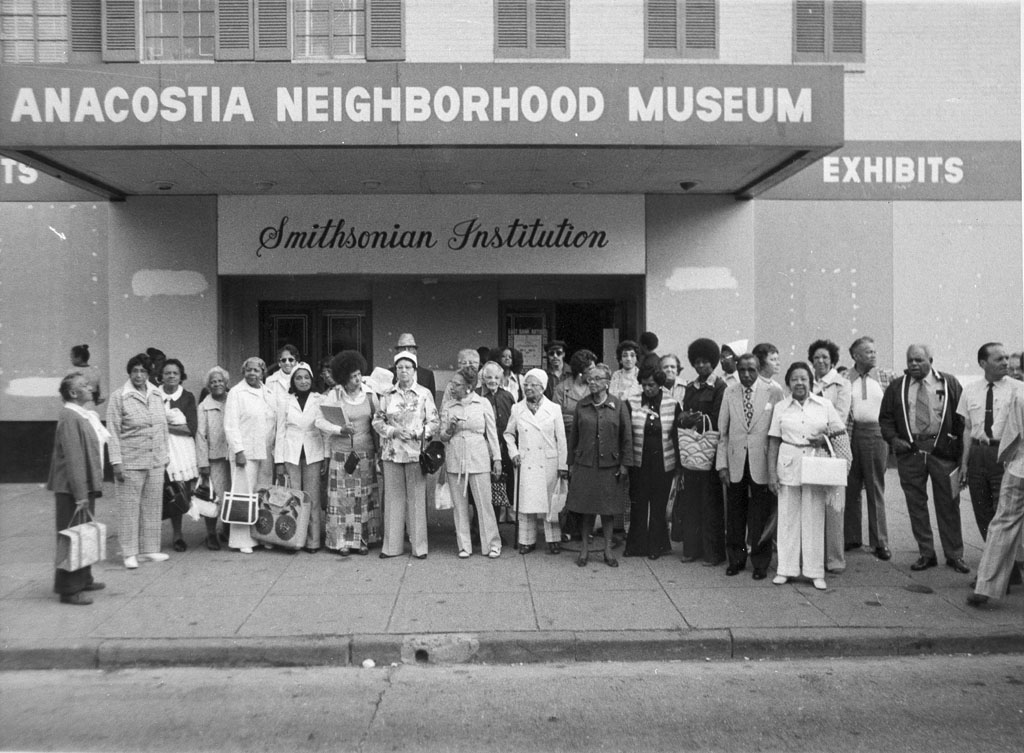
Hutchinson with the Anacostia Historical Society in 1967.

==== National Park Service ====
In 1973, she took the same title, Education Research Specialist, at the Frederick Douglass Home National Memorial for the National Park Service. There, she trained staff regarding the interpretation of the memorial.

==== Return to the Smithsonian ====
The following year, 1974, Hutchinson became the Historian and Director of Research at the Anacostia Community Museum (ACM). She helped write the mission for the museum, acquired objects for the collection, strengthened relationships with the other Smithsonian Institution units and the local neighborhood. She researched various content for exhibitions, including The Anacostia Story: 1608-1903, about the Anacostia community, The Frederick Douglass Years, Out of Africa: From West African Kingdoms to Colonization, and Black Women: Achievements Against the Odds. Hutchinson also developed the museum’s oral history program and helped found the Anacostia Historical Society.

Hutchinson's work influenced her scholarly contributions and vice versa. Her book about Anna J. Cooper was called an "important contribution" to American history in The Georgia Historical Quarterly. Hutchinson also focused on public engagement, providing advice and information to scholars, students, teachers, and amateur historians when many other Smithsonian scholars would not respond directly to public queries. She retired in 1986.

=== Death ===
She died at the age of 86 on October 12, 2014.

== Selected works ==
- Hutchinson, Louise Daniel. The Anacostia Story, 1608-1930. Washington: Smithsonian Institution Press (1977). ISBN 0874745330
- Hutchinson, Louise Daniel. Anna J. Cooper, a voice from the South. Washington: Smithsonian Institution Press (1982). ISBN 0874745284
- Hutchinson, Louise Daniel. Out of Africa: From west African kingdoms to colonization. Washington: Smithsonian Institution Press (1979). ISBN 0874745349
