= Anacostia Community Museum =

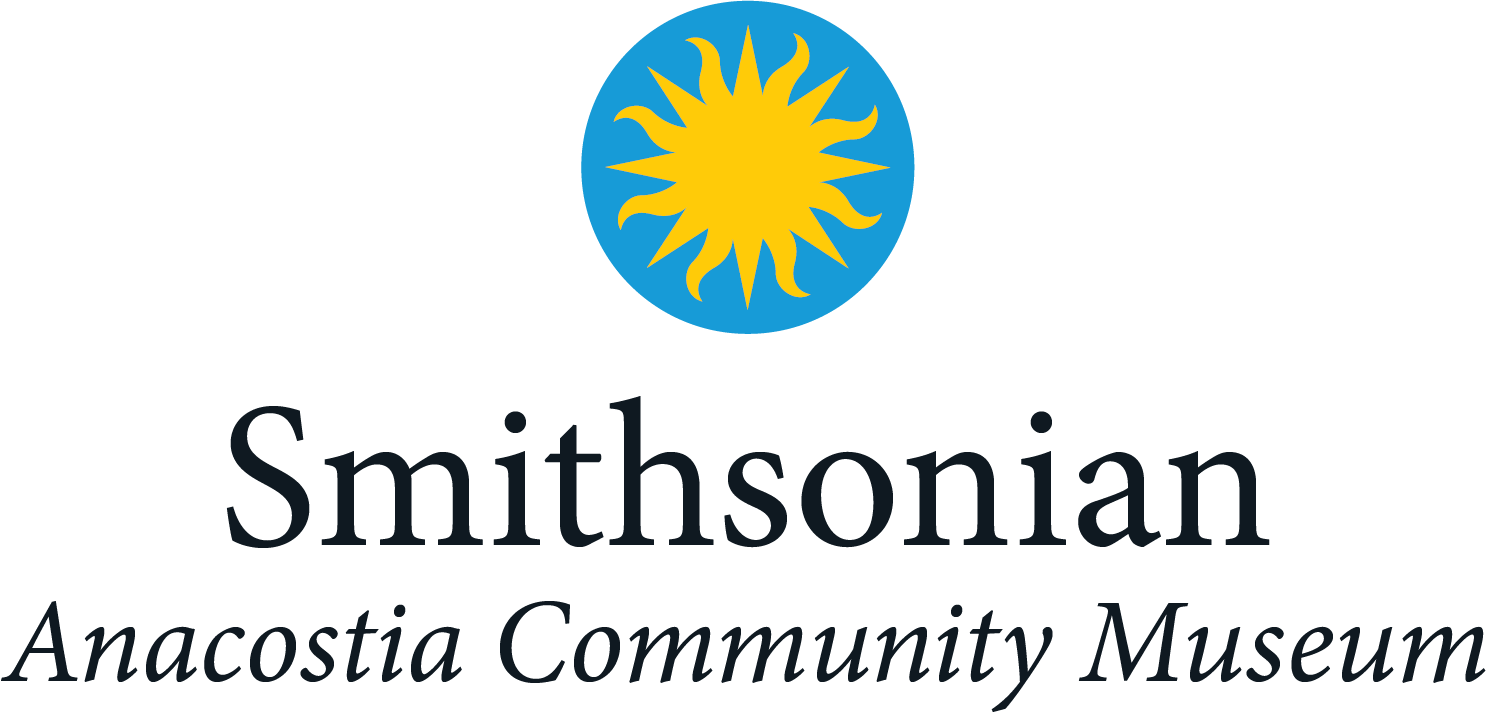

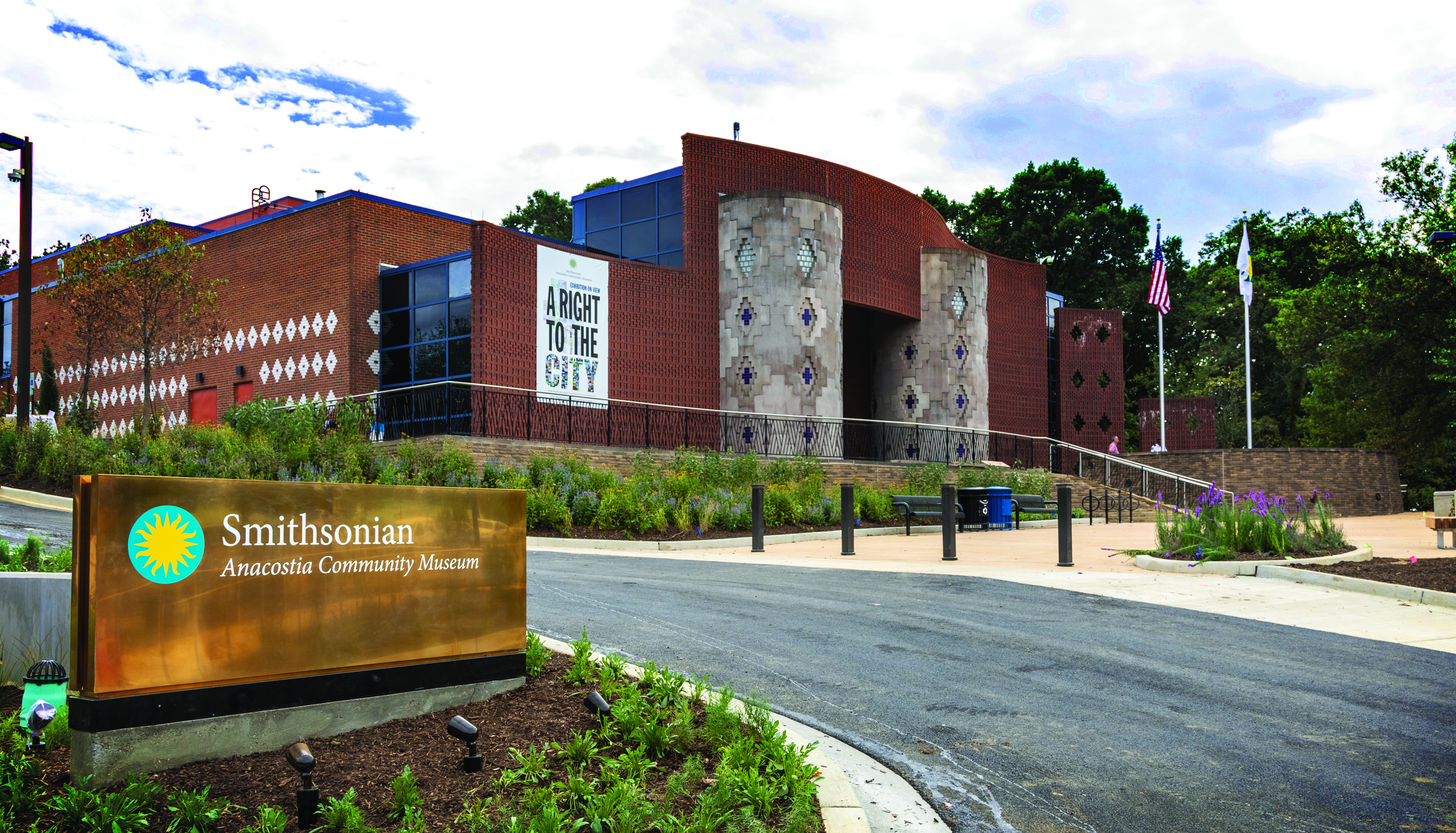

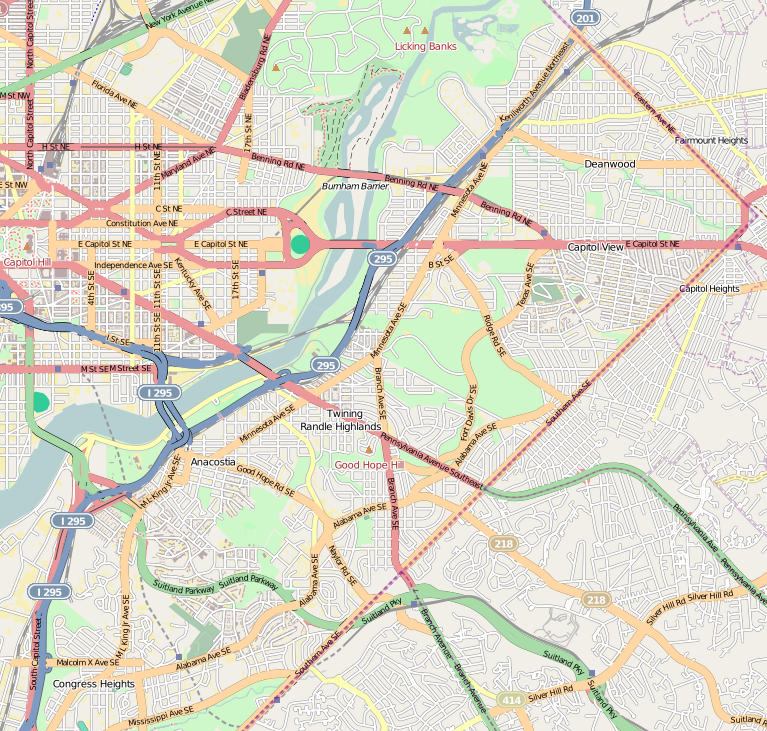
- Location within Washington, D.C.
- Established: 1967
- Location: Washington, D.C.
- Coordinates: 38.856854°N 76.976888°W
- Type: Community museum
- Visitors: 38,963 (2008)
- Director: Melanie Adams
- Public transit access: Anacostia
- Website: Official website

The Anacostia Community Museum (known colloquially as the ACM) is a community museum in the Anacostia neighborhood of Washington, D.C., in the United States. It is one of twenty museums under the umbrella of the Smithsonian Institution and was the first federally funded community museum in the United States. The museum, founded in 1967, was created with the intention to bring aspects of the Smithsonian museums, located on the National Mall, to the Anacostia neighborhood, with the hope that community members from the neighborhood would visit the main Smithsonian museums. It became federally funded in 1970 and focuses on the community in and around Anacostia in its exhibitions. This museum also houses a library.

In 2025, President Donald Trump proposed a federal budget that would discontinue funding for the institution. The amount would equal 60% of the museum's total budget and its proposed withdrawal threatens the continuity of the institution.

== History ==
=== Origins ===
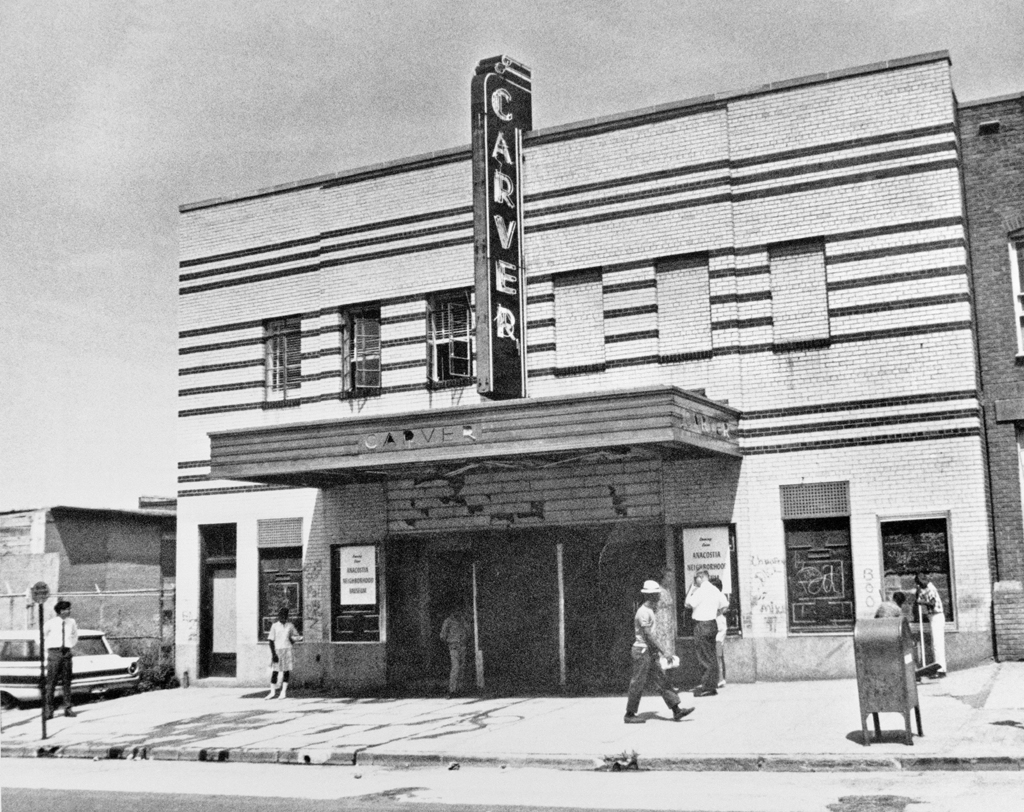
The Carver Theater served as the first home to ACM.

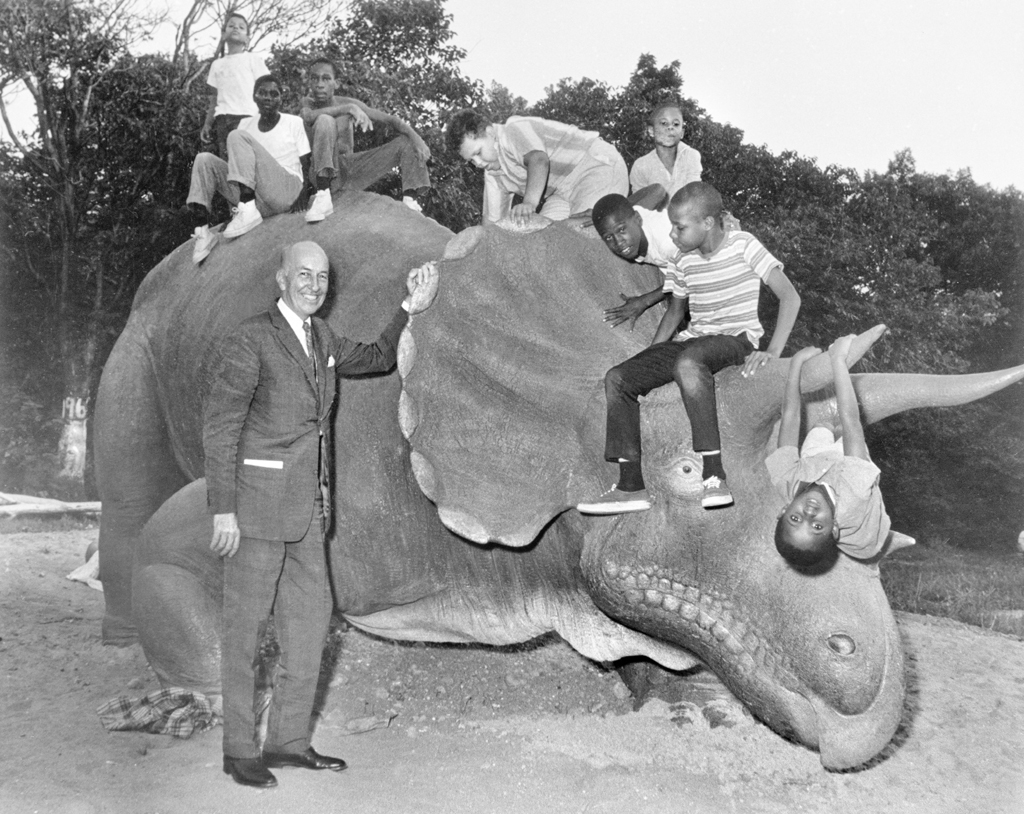
Uncle Beazley and S. Dillon Ripley at the opening of the Anacostia Neighborhood Museum on September 15, 1967

The Anacostia Community Museum was originally described as "an experimental store-front museum" by the Smithsonian Institution in 1966. Smithsonian Secretary S. Dillon Ripley intended for the museum to serve as an outreach opportunity to bring more African Americans to the National Mall to visit Smithsonian museums. The idea, which rose from a Smithsonian-hosted conference in 1966, came into reality in March 1967, when the Smithsonian acquired the Carver Theater in the Anacostia neighborhood. The Smithsonian sought community support, and a council of local Anacostia residents came together to advise on the project. John Kinard was appointed director of the museum in June 1967. A pastor and activist during the Civil Rights Movement, Kinard was heavily involved in the Anacostia neighborhood, and he made sure that the young people of the neighborhood were involved in the creation of the museum. Every week, the museum's Neighborhood Advisory Committee of community members would meet to help plan the programming and exhibitions. Staff and community members worked side by side to change the building from a defunct movie theater into an exhibition space. The community also assisted in choosing what objects would be displayed.

The Anacostia Neighborhood Museum opened on September 15, 1967. The museum had eight staff members, and only one was permanent. There were no curators or researchers or librarians. A life-size fiberglass model of a Triceratops, which in 1968 would appear as "Uncle Beazley" in the children's television movie, The Enormous Egg, and which is now near Lemur Island in the National Zoological Park (the National Zoo), attended the museum's opening.

In 1968, the museum hired a staff photographer and a photography lab was opened on site. The museum would not become part of the Smithsonian Institution's federal budget until 1970. That year, the Anacostia Research Center was founded, with funding from the Carnegie Corporation, to create an oral history program. The museum hired its first historian, Louise Daniel Hutchinson, in 1971. By 1972, the museum had ten full-time, permanent staff members, working within three departments: director's office, education, and a research and exhibitions department. The museum found it challenging to incorporate the community into its planning processes as it grew larger, and more developed processes formed to incorporate the community into exhibits. The Neighborhood Advisory Committee, which consisted of ninety people, was cut down in size and renamed the Board of Directors.

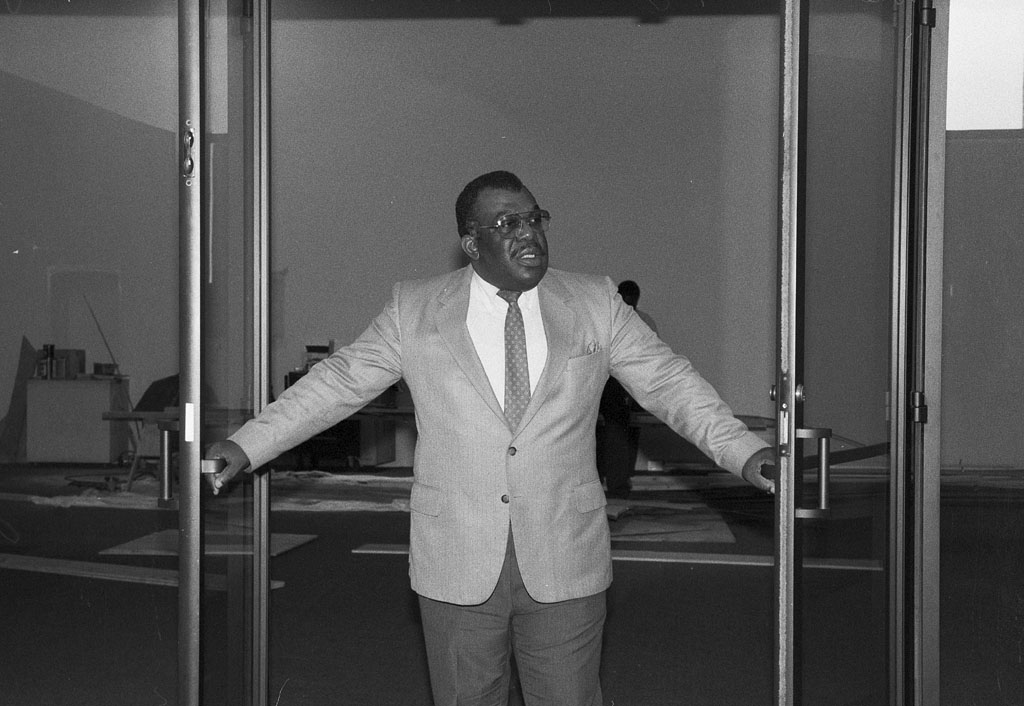
John Kinard at the new museum in 1987

The Exhibits Design and Production Laboratory, located at Fort Stanton (Washington, D.C.), was opened in October 1974. It was there where preparations for a new museum building took place. In 1976, it suffered a fire after masonite sheets fell from a forklift, and into a container of lacquer thinner. Staff were unable to call for help due to the fire damaging the phone lines. The damage cost approximately $75,000 and no one was injured. The museum became the first Smithsonian museum to use labels for the hearing impaired in their exhibitions, in 1980. An archives devoted to the area of Anacostia was created in 1977.

The new Anacostia Museum was opened on May 17, 1987, located at Fort Stanton. The name change stemmed from the change in the museum's mission, to celebrate African American history not only in Anacostia, but around the world. Long-time director John Kinard died in 1989.

=== After John Kinard ===
Steven Newsome, a professional librarian, became the new museum director in 1991, the same year the museum established its own library. The museum went through another name change, in 1995, becoming the Anacostia Museum and Center for African American History and Culture. Its intent was to serve as the location for the National Museum of African American History and Culture. During Newsome's tenure the museum underwent an $8.5 million renovation. In 2004 Newsome retired, with James Early becoming acting director. Once more, the museum decided to change its mission, to focus specifically on Anacostia communities, and changed its name to the Anacostia Community Museum in 2006. That year, Camille Akeju became the director.

With the arrival of Akeju, the museum's exhibition process changed, removing the community-driven exhibition process, which allowed community members to submit proposals for exhibitions. The process is now curator-focused, with exhibition concepts being chosen by staff.

== Architecture ==
The Fort Stanton building, which opened in 1987, was designed by Keyes Condon Florance, Architrave and Wisnewski Blair Associates. The design, based on the "cultural expressionism style", aimed to make use of the natural setting it resides in. The building exterior is made of red brick motifs reflecting kente cloth. Cylinders made of concrete with glass blocks and blue tile sit in the facade of the building. The cylinders pull influence from the ruins of Great Zimbabwe. Large picture windows reside at the entrance.

In March 2019 the museum closed for a $4.5 million renovation. It reopened in October 2019.

== Collections ==
ACM did not have a permanent collection until the late 1970s. The museum was not allowed to build such a collection by the Smithsonian. The Smithsonian lacked objects in its collections related to African American history and culture, and John Kinard helped encourage other museums to start acquiring such items, such as artwork and pieces owned by Duke Ellington. In 1977 the museum was able to start building its permanent collection. The museum library was established in 1991. It wasn't until 1992 that ACM created its first collections management policy, specifying a focus on the Anacostia neighborhood and surrounding areas. The museum was donated the archives of Lorenzo Dow Turner, in 2003, by his wife, Lois Turner Williams. In 2010, an exhibition Word, Shout, Song: Lorenzo Dow Turner, Connecting Communities Through Language, was held to showcase the collection. The museum also has a collection of art including work by artists such as James A. Porter, Sam Gilliam, and Benny Andrews.

== Exhibitions ==
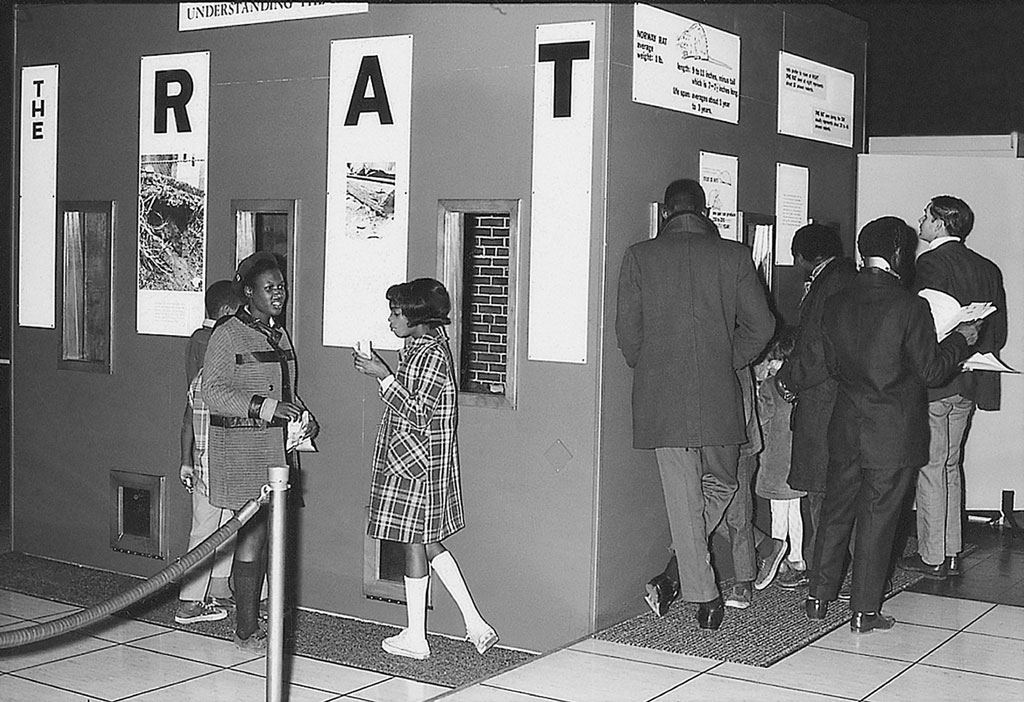
Visitors at the Anacostia Neighborhood Museum's exhibit of The Rat: Man's Invited Affliction. The exhibit was on display from November 16, 1969, to January 31, 1970.

Throughout its history, the museum's exhibitions have reflected the community of Anacostia, Washington, D.C., and often concerns seen throughout urban communities in the United States. African American history and art has also been showcased in exhibitions, including subjects such as immigration, slavery, civil rights, and music. The opening exhibition at the museum, in 1967, featured the reproduction of an Anacostia store front from 1890, a Project Mercury spacecraft, a theater, a small zoo, and a varied collection of natural history objects. The small zoo featured a parrot, named George, which was a gift from the National Zoo. George died in April, 1977. Other early exhibitions at the museum, when it was still called the Anacostia Neighborhood Museum, included 1969's The Rat: Man's Invited Affliction, which examined rat infestations. The museum's bicentennial exhibition, Blacks in the Western Movement, focused on the stories of African Americans who explored and settled the American west. The exhibition traveled nationwide and was made into a documentary film. These early exhibitions, which often consisted of panel displays, were called "pasteboard exhibits," by director John Kinard. Community members in the early years frequently helped put together the exhibitions, along with staff such as exhibit designer James E. Mayo.

ACM started working with the Smithsonian Institution Traveling Exhibition Service (SITES) to create traveling exhibitions, which were the first major African American themed exhibitions at the Smithsonian. In 1977 the exhibition The Anacostia Story exhibited the history of the neighborhood from 1608 to 1930. Frederick Douglass, who lived in Anacostia, was the focus of The Frederick Douglass Years. The 1979 exhibition Out of Africa: From West African Kingdoms to Colonization was the first to make use of the museum's budding permanent collection, and Chancellor Williams lectured. The museum closed for little over two months in, from November until January, 1980, re-opening with the exhibition Anna J. Cooper: A Voice from the South. To celebrate the centennial of the birth of Franklin D. Roosevelt, the Smithsonian organized an institution wide series of events, with ACN organizing Mary McLeod Bethune and Roosevelt's Black Cabinet. Mercer Ellington, the son of Duke Ellington, filmed a public service announcement for the exhibition The Renaissance: Black Arts of the '20s. ACM focused on Washington, D.C.'s role in equal and civil rights in To Achieve These Rights: The Struggle for Equal Rights and Self-Determination in the District of Columbia, 1791-1978. The Washington region was a focus again with Footsteps from North Brentwood, which discussed the history of Prince George's County, Maryland.

In 2006, the ACM exhibition Reclaiming Midwives: Pillars of Community Support, discussed the roles of midwives in African American communities. ACM partnered with the Mexican Cultural Institute to produce The African Presence in Mexico. The 2010 exhibition Word, Shout and Song examined the work of Lorenzo Dow Turner and the Gullah language.

== Education ==
The museum began offering accredited education courses with teachers in 1977. The Museum Education Department also publishes history publications about African American history. In 1987 the ACM created the Museum Academy Program. The program focuses on working with local children throughout the year.

== See also ==
- Frederick Douglass National Historic Site
- National Museum of African American History and Culture
- National Museum of African Art
- Alexandria Black History Museum
- Robert H. Robinson Library
- List of museums focused on African Americans
