= Paifang =

Traditional style of Chinese architectural arched gateway

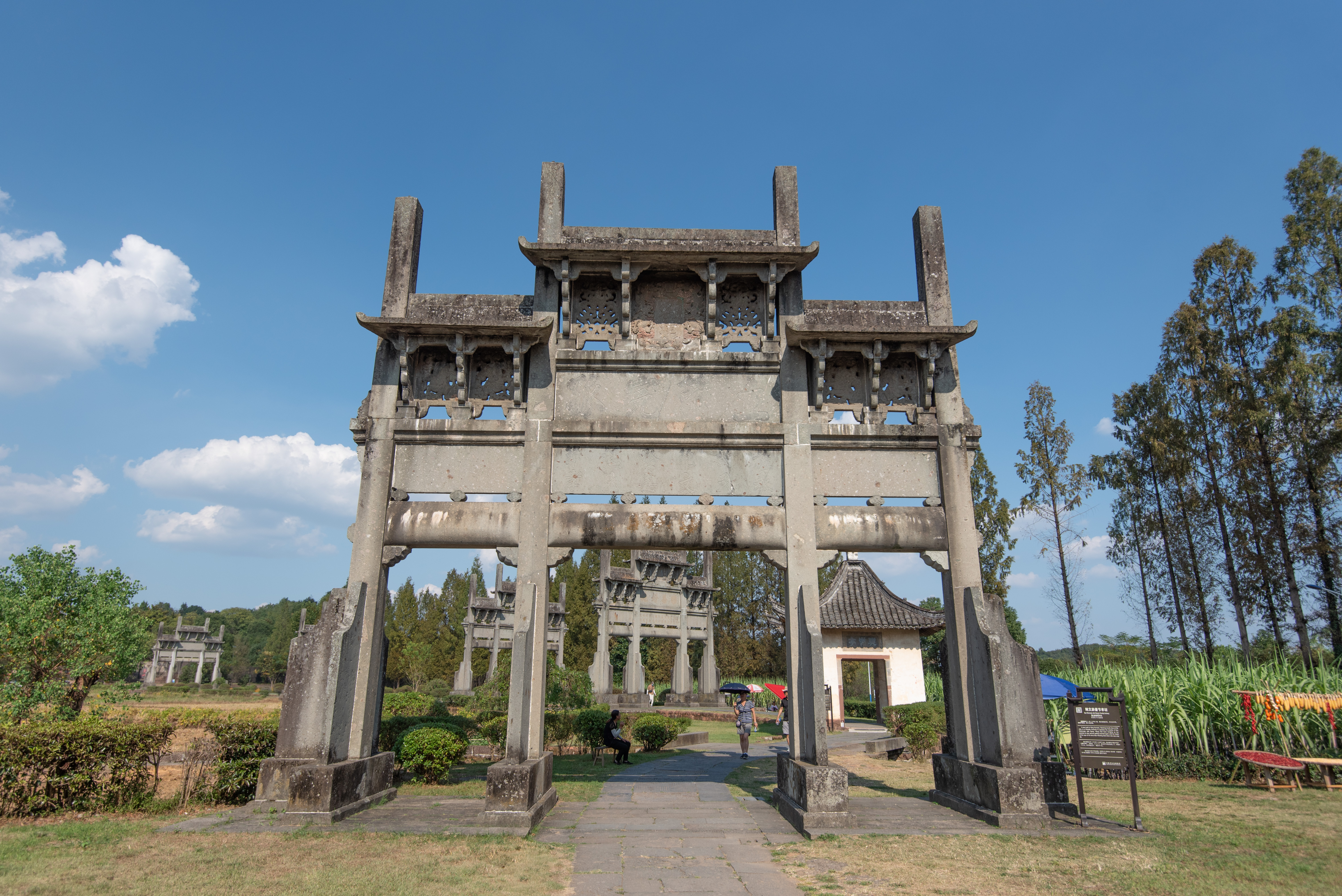
- Tangyue Paifang Archway in She County, Anhui consists of seven exquisitely carved paifangs built during Ming and Qing dynasties
- Chinese: 牌坊
- Literal meaning: memorial archway gate
Transcriptions
Standard Mandarin
- Hanyu Pinyin: páifāng
- Bopomofo: ㄆㄞˊ ㄈㄤ
- IPA: [pʰǎɪfáŋ]
Wu
- Romanization: ba^{平} faon^{平}
Hakka
- Romanization: pai^{2} fong^{1}
Yue: Cantonese
- Jyutping: paai^{4} fong^{1}
Southern Min
- Hokkien POJ: pâi-hông

Pailou
- Simplified Chinese: 牌楼
- Traditional Chinese: 牌樓
- Literal meaning: memorial archway edifice
Transcriptions
Standard Mandarin
- Hanyu Pinyin: páilóu
- Bopomofo: ㄆㄞˊ ㄌㄡˊ
Wu
- Romanization: ba^{平} leu^{平}
Hakka
- Romanization: pai^{2} leu^{2}
Yue: Cantonese
- Jyutping: paai^{4} lau^{4}
Southern Min
- Hokkien POJ: pâi-lâu

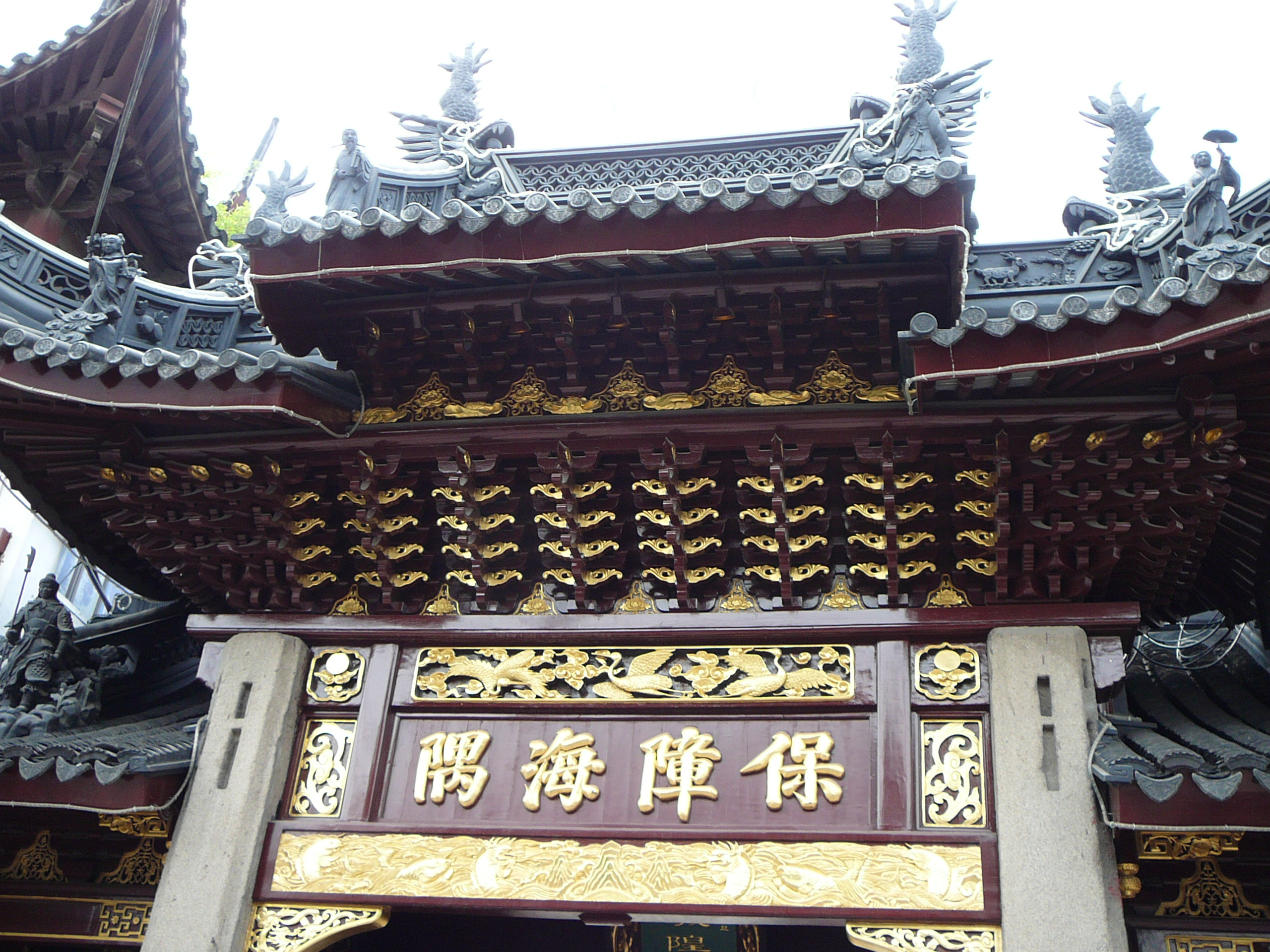
A decorated paifang in Shanghai

A paifang, also known as a pailou, is a traditional style of Chinese architecture, often used in arch or gateway structures.

== Etymology ==
The word paifang (Chinese: 牌坊; pinyin: páifāng) was originally a collective term for the top two levels of administrative division and subdivisions of ancient Chinese cities. The largest division within a city in ancient China was a fang (坊; fāng), equivalent to a current day ward. Each fang was enclosed by walls or fences, and the gates of these enclosures were shut and guarded every night. Each fang was further divided into several pai (牌; pái; 'placard'), which is equivalent to a current day (unincorporated) community. Each pai, in turn, contained an area including several hutongs (alleyways).

This system of urban administrative division and subdivision reached an elaborate level during the Tang dynasty, and continued in the following dynasties. For example, during the Ming dynasty, Beijing was divided into a total of 36 fangs. Originally, the word paifang referred to the gate of a fang and the marker for an entrance of a building complex or a town; but by the Song dynasty, a paifang had evolved into a purely decorative monument.

== History ==
During the Tang dynasty, it was called a wutoumen (烏頭門; wūtóumén; 'black top gate'), because the top of the two posts were painted black. A wutoumen was reserved for officials of rank 6 or higher.

The construction of wutomen was standardized in the Yingzao Fashi of the mid Song dynasty. It consisted of two posts and a horizontal beam forming a frame and two doors. By the Ming and Qing dynasties, it was called a pailou or paifang, and evolved into a more elaborate structure with more posts and gates, with a superstructural gable on top; the highest rank was a five gate-six post-eleven gable pailou.

It has been theorized that the paifang gate architecture was influenced by Buddhist torana temple gates. Paifang have traditional Chinese architectural characteristics such as multi-tiered roofs, various supporting posts, and archway-shapes of traditional gates and towers.

== Style ==
Paifang come in a number of forms. One form involves placing wooden pillars onto stone bases, which are bound together with wooden beams. This type of paifang is always beautifully decorated, with the pillars usually painted in red, the beams decorated with intricate designs and Chinese calligraphy, and the roof covered with coloured tiles, complete with mythical beasts—just like a Chinese palace. Another form of paifang is in the form of true archways made of stone or bricks; the walls may be painted, or decorated with coloured tiles; the top of the archways is decorated like their wooden counterparts. Yet another form of paifang, built mainly on religious and burial grounds, consists of plain white stone pillars and beams, with neither roof tiles nor any coloured decoration, but feature elaborate carvings created by master masons. Another form is in the Han dynasty style, and is two matching towers, such as in Beihai.

Outside of China, the paifang has long been the symbol of Chinatowns. The largest outside of China is in the United States: Friendship Archway at 14.50 m (47 ft 7 in) tall and 23 m (75 ft) wide, completed in 1986 at H and 7th in Washington D.C.'s Chinatown. In Europe, the largest paifang spans Nelson Street in Liverpool, completed in 2000 and standing 13.5 m (44 ft) tall. The first paifang in the United States was raised in 1915 as a temporary installation for the Chinese pavilion of the Panama–Pacific International Exposition in San Francisco, and the oldest still standing was erected in 1938 for Los Angeles, Chinatown West Gate on Hill Street; it was listed as a city Historic-Cultural Monument (#825) along with its counterpart, Chinatown East Gate (1939, #826) in November 2005. The paifang at the entrance to Ottawa's Chinatown was decorated by Chinese artists using Chinese materials and techniques.

In the past, "Chastity Paifang" were given to widows who remained unmarried till death, praising what was seen as loyalty to their deceased husbands.

== Gallery ==
=== Mainland China ===
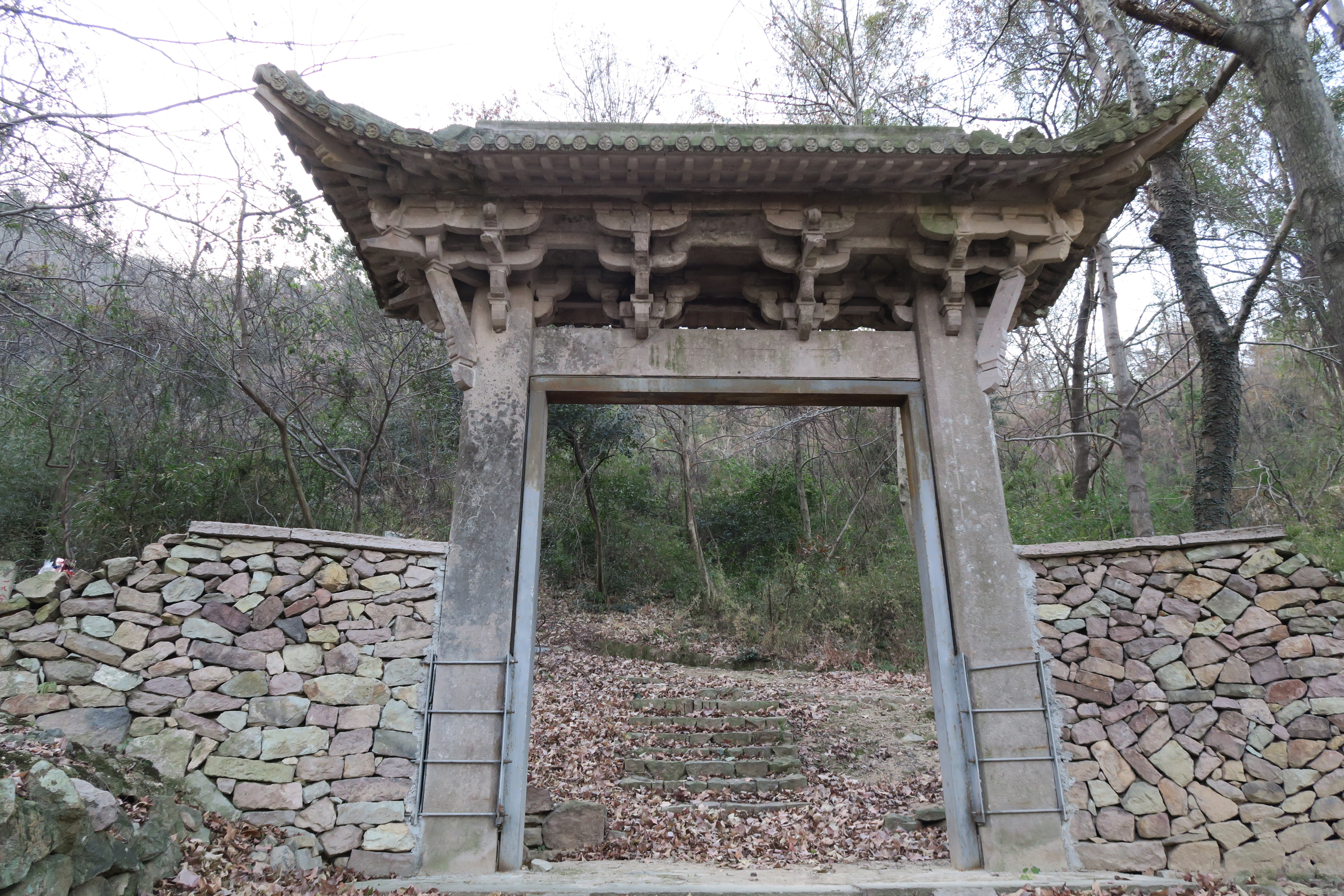
Hesheng stone paifang, first built in the Song dynasty, from Yinzhou, Zhejiang. One of the oldest preserved stone paifangs in China.

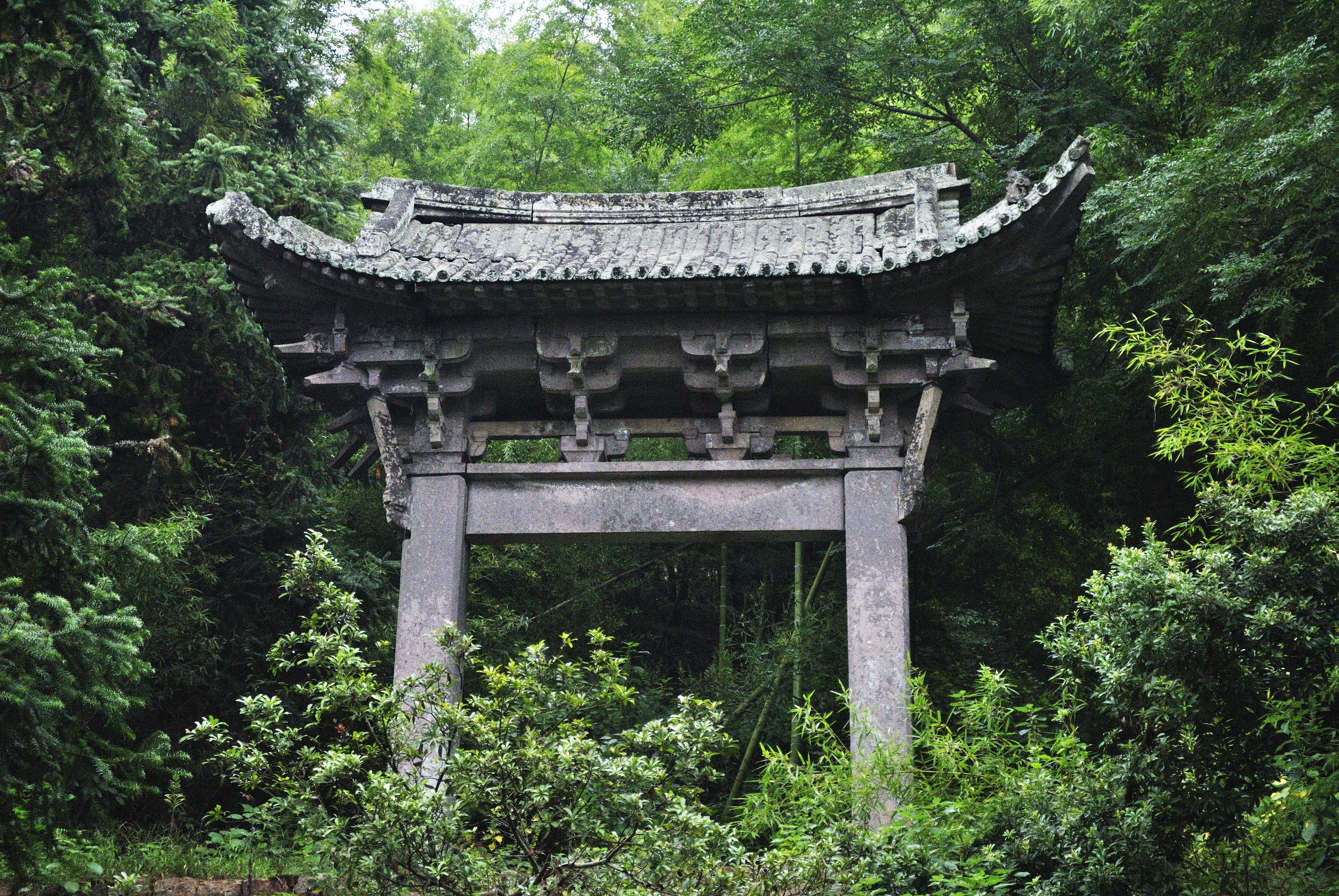
Miaogouhou stone paifang, first built in the Song dynasty, from Yinzhou, Zhejiang. Located close to Hesheng stone paifang, and is also one of the oldest preserved paifangs in China.

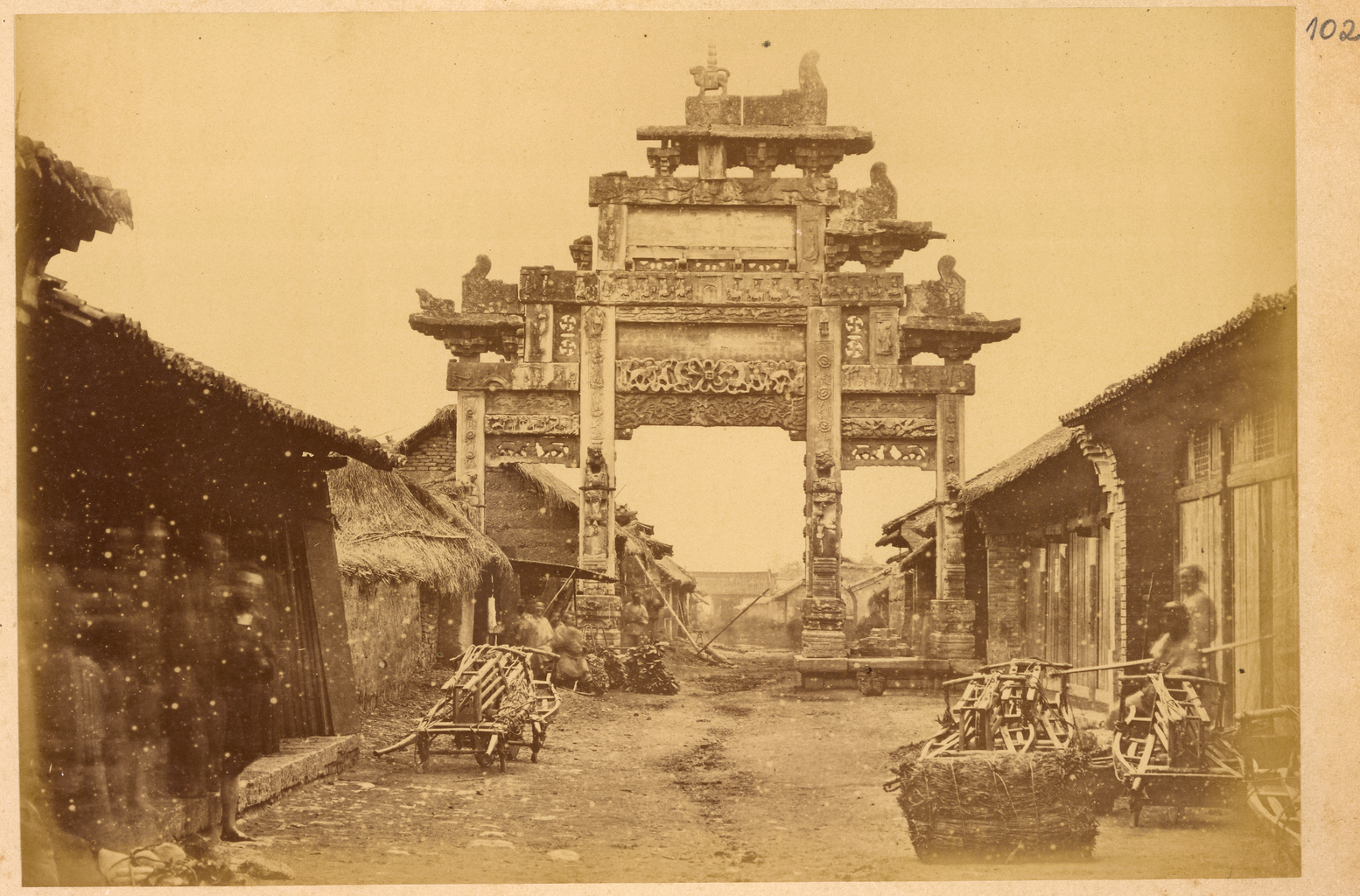
Ornamental gateway (pailou) from the Han dynasty across a street lined with small shops. Hanzhong, Shaanxi in 1875

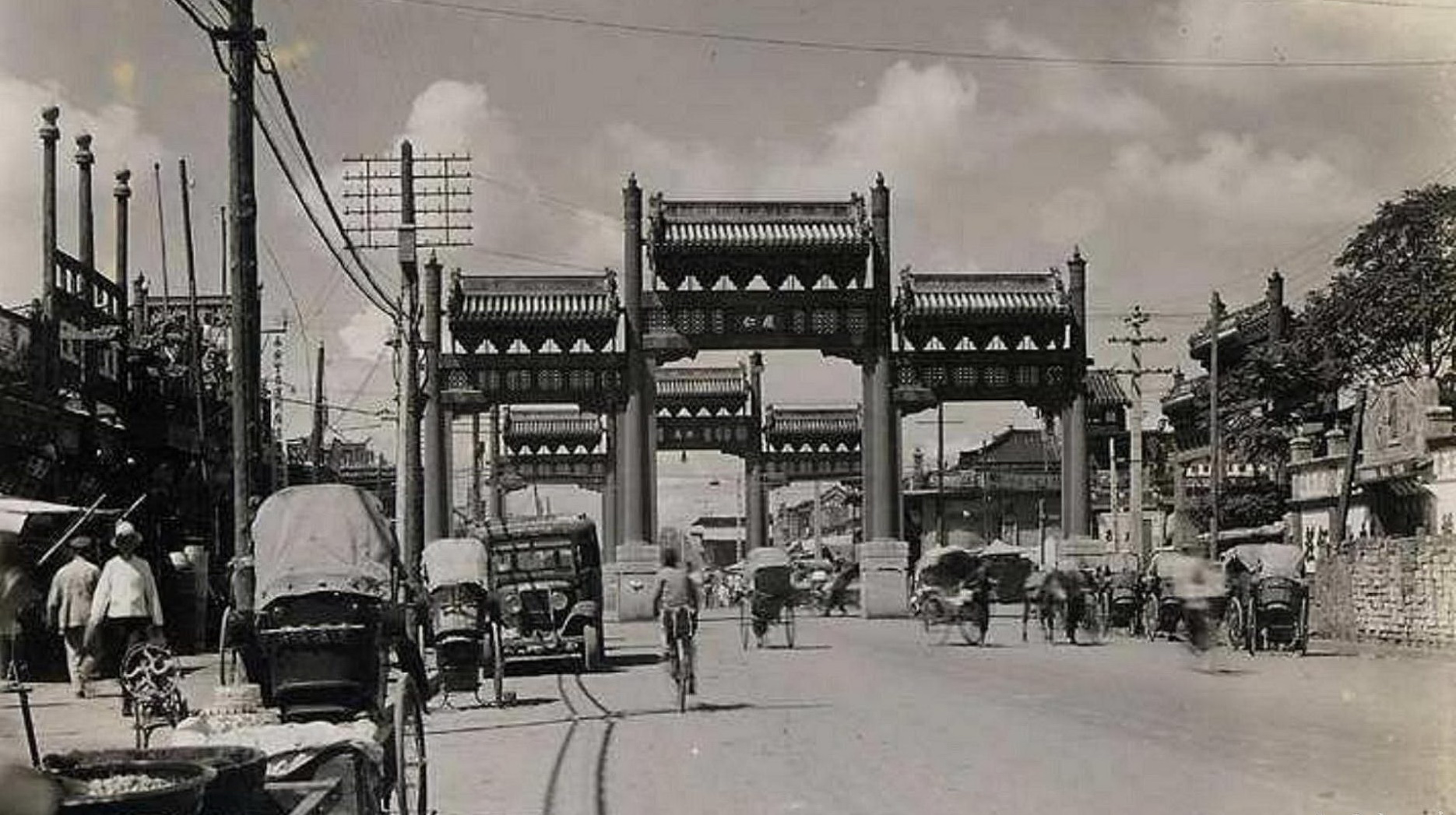
Dongsi, an intersection in Beijing, had four paifangs in the 1920s.

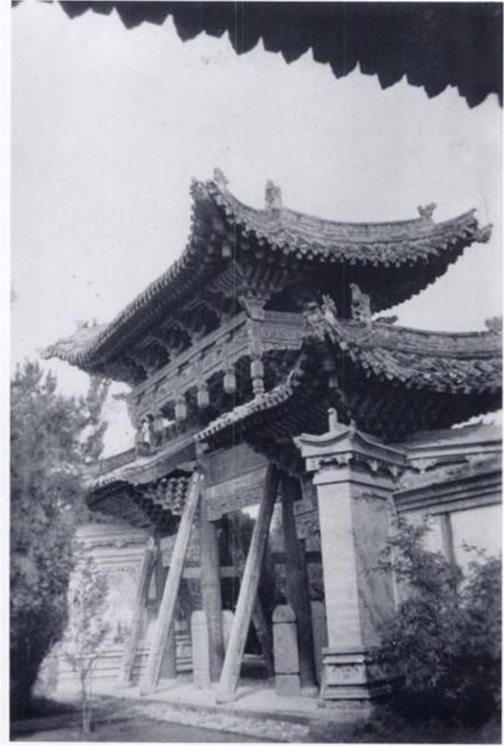
A paifang photographed in Jishishan, Gansu in 1933

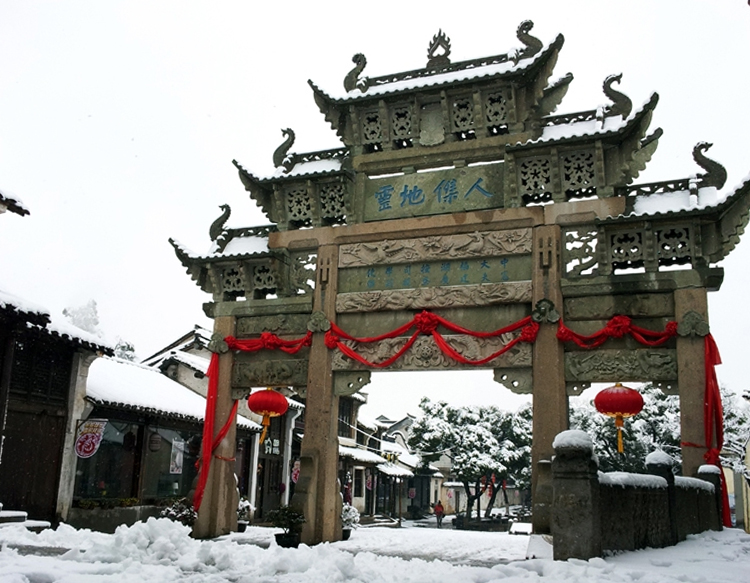
Paifang built in the late Ming dynasty, in Huishan Ancient Town, Wuxi, Jiangsu

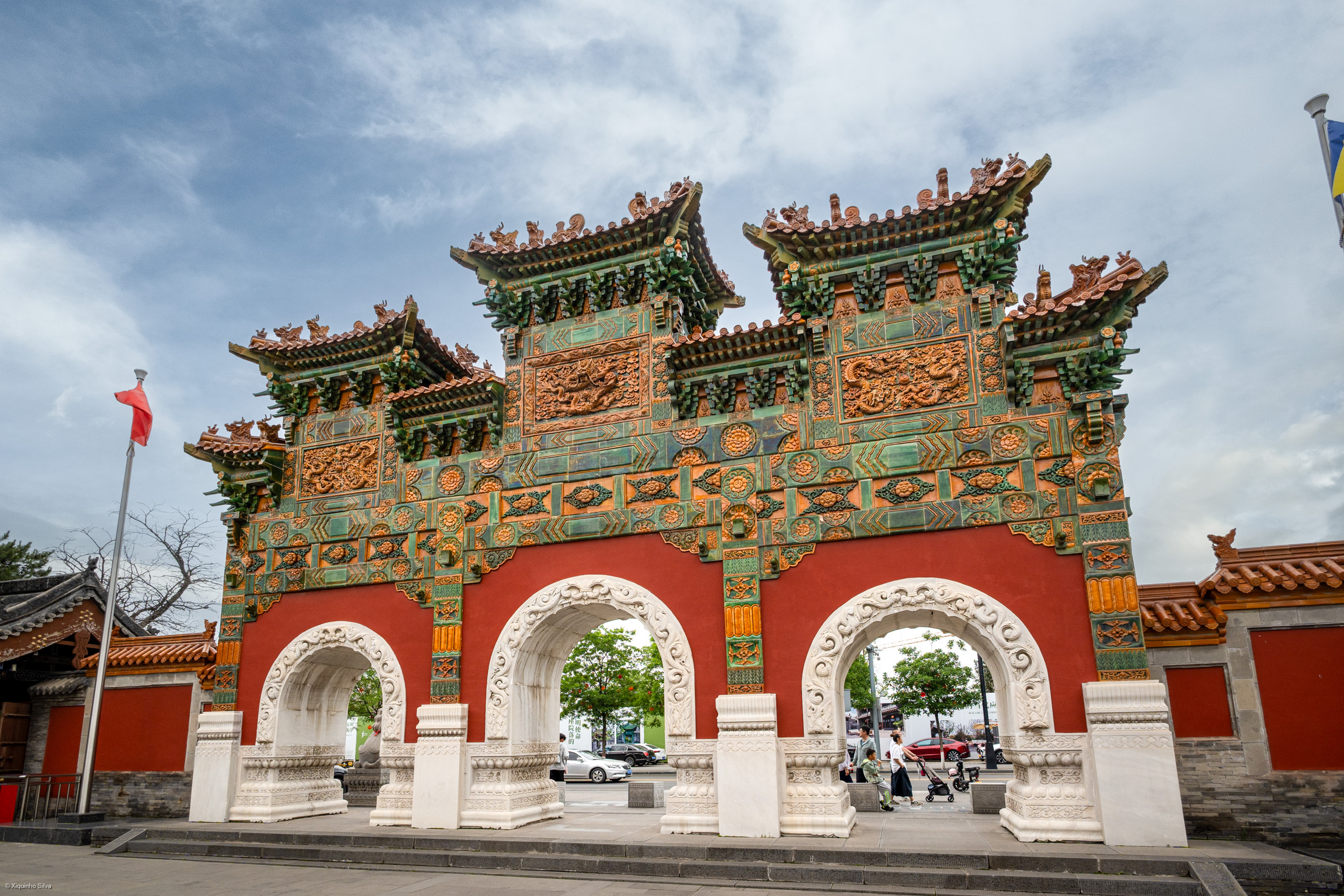
Glazed porcelain paifang at Fahua Temple, Datong, Shanxi.

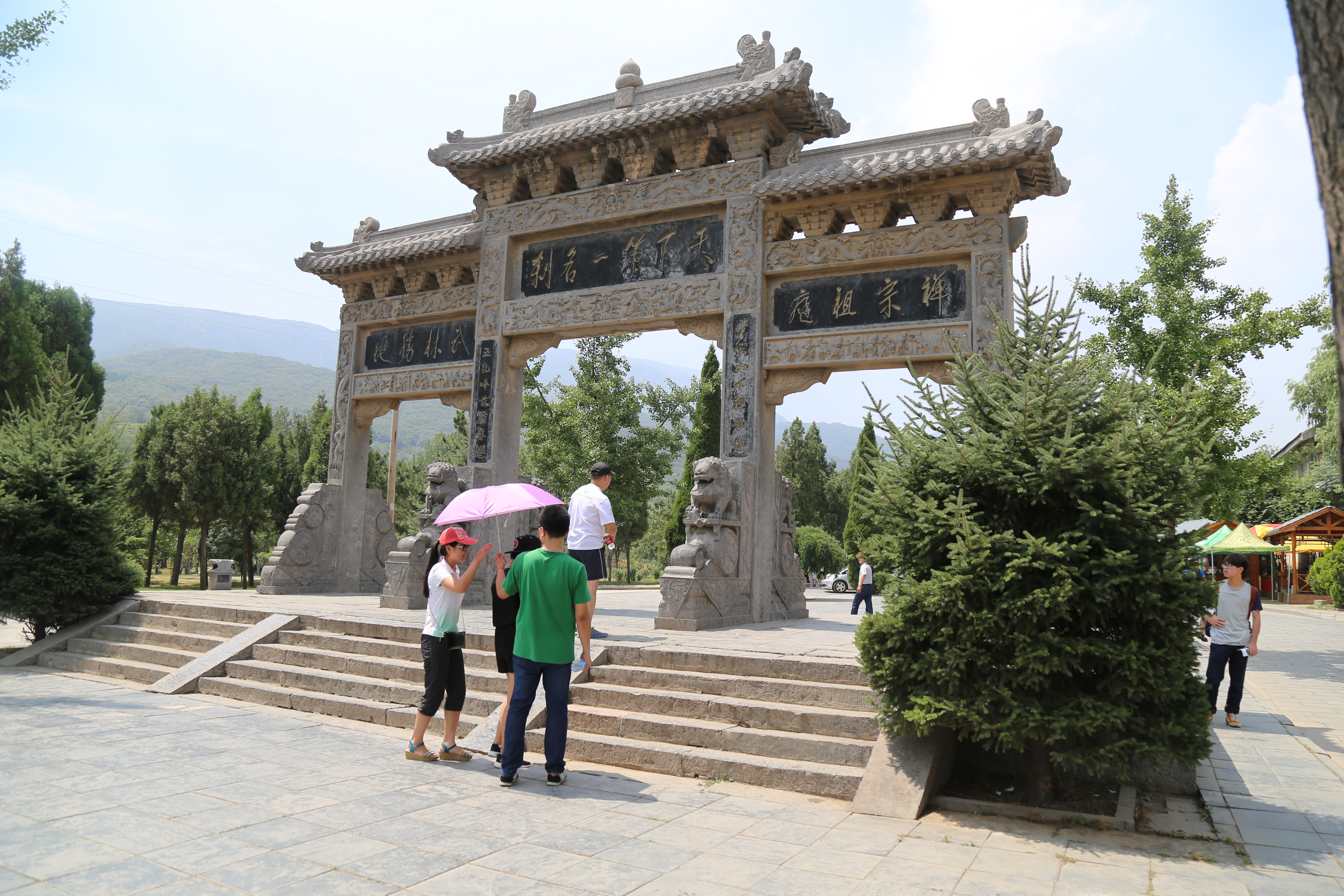
Paifang of the Shaolin Monastery, Dengfeng, Henan

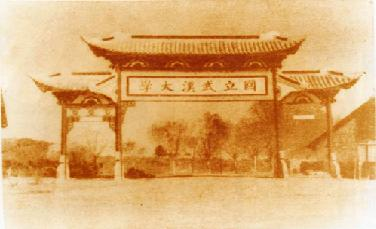
Paifang of Wuhan University in 1920

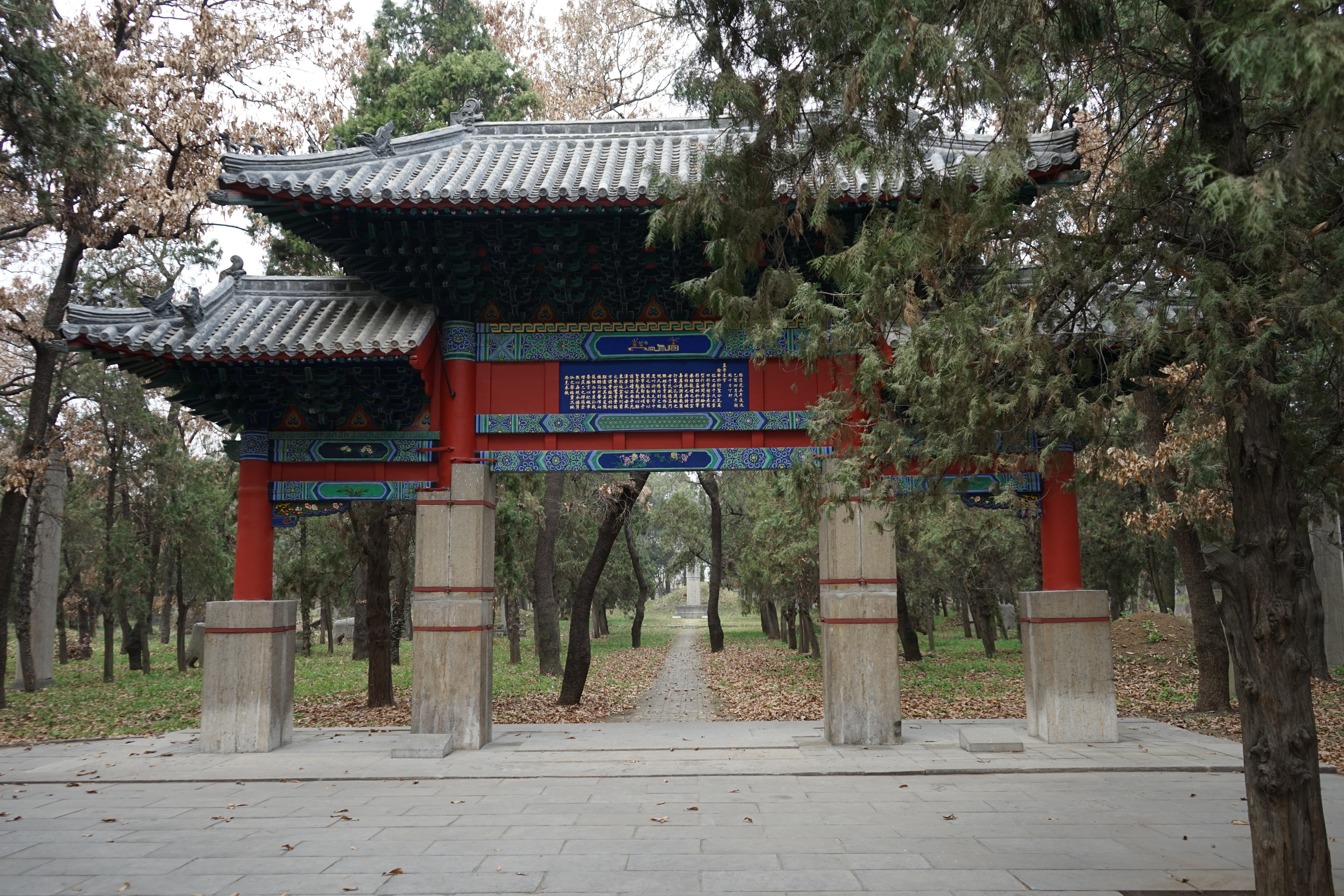
Paifang at the Cemetery of Confucius, tomb of Lady Yu, wife of Kong Xianpei (72nd generation) in Qufu, Shandong

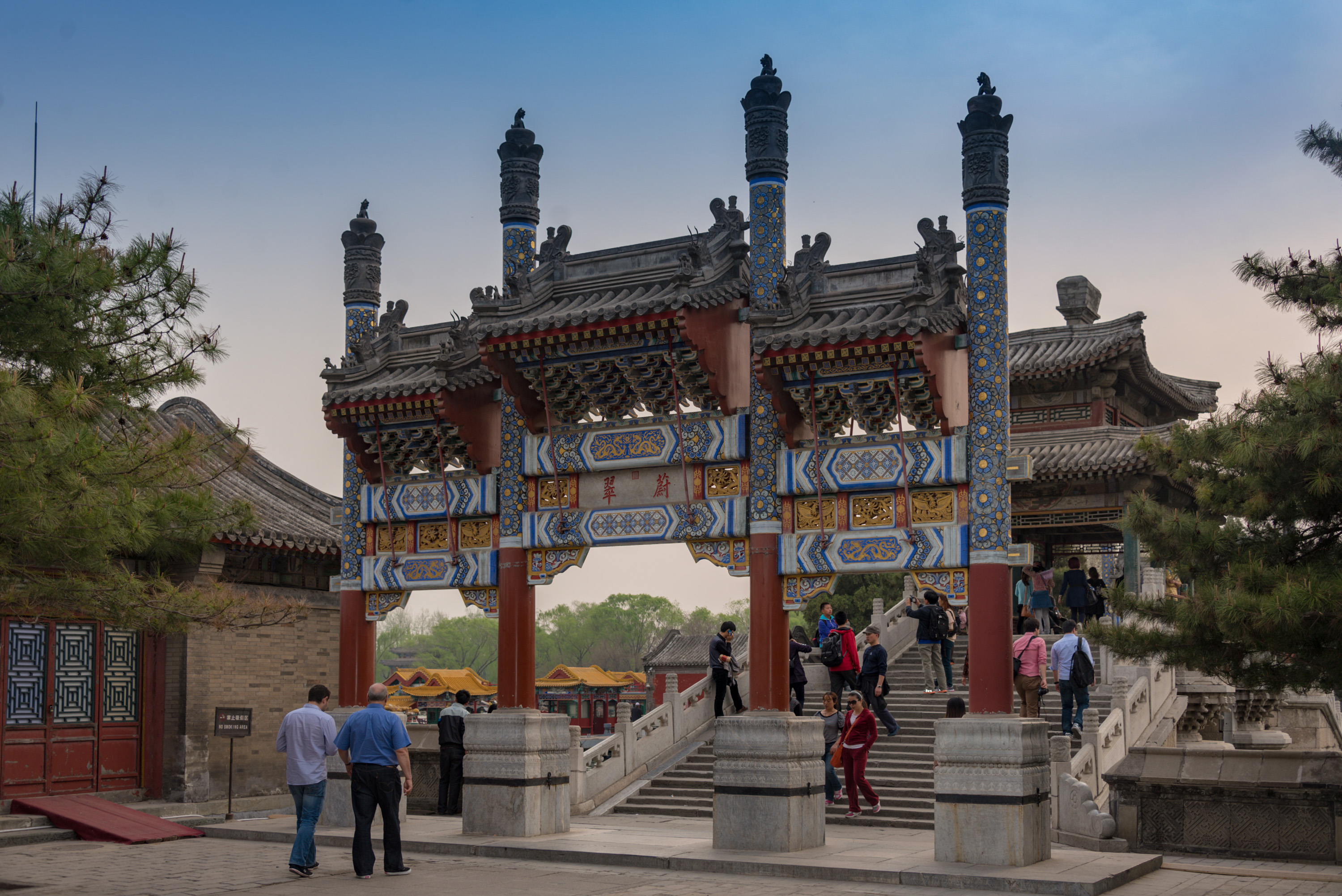
Decorated paifang at the Summer Palace in Beijing.

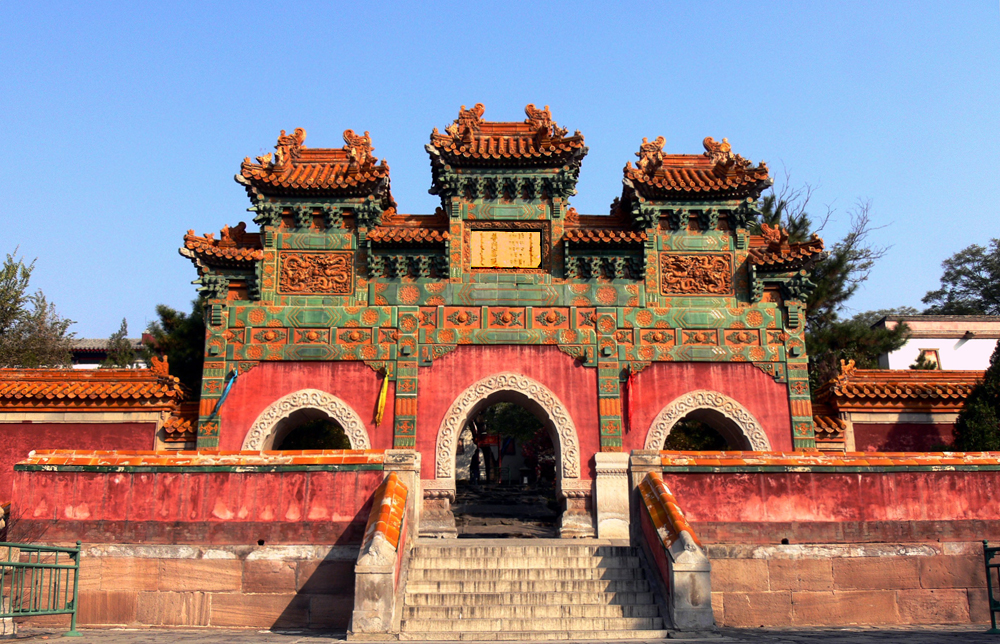
Colour glaze gateway at Putuo Zongcheng Temple, Chengde, Hebei.

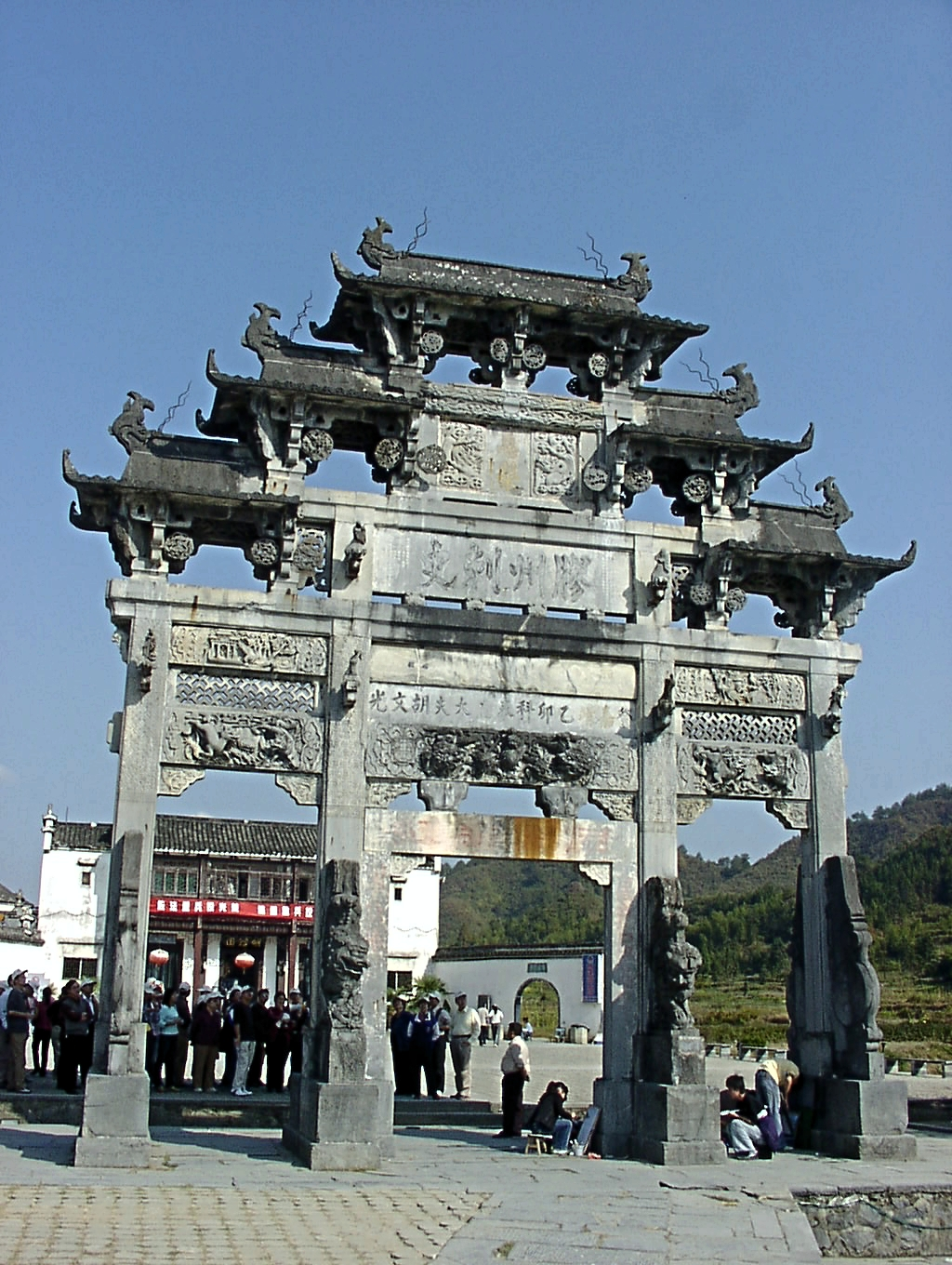
Paifang in Xidi, Anhui.

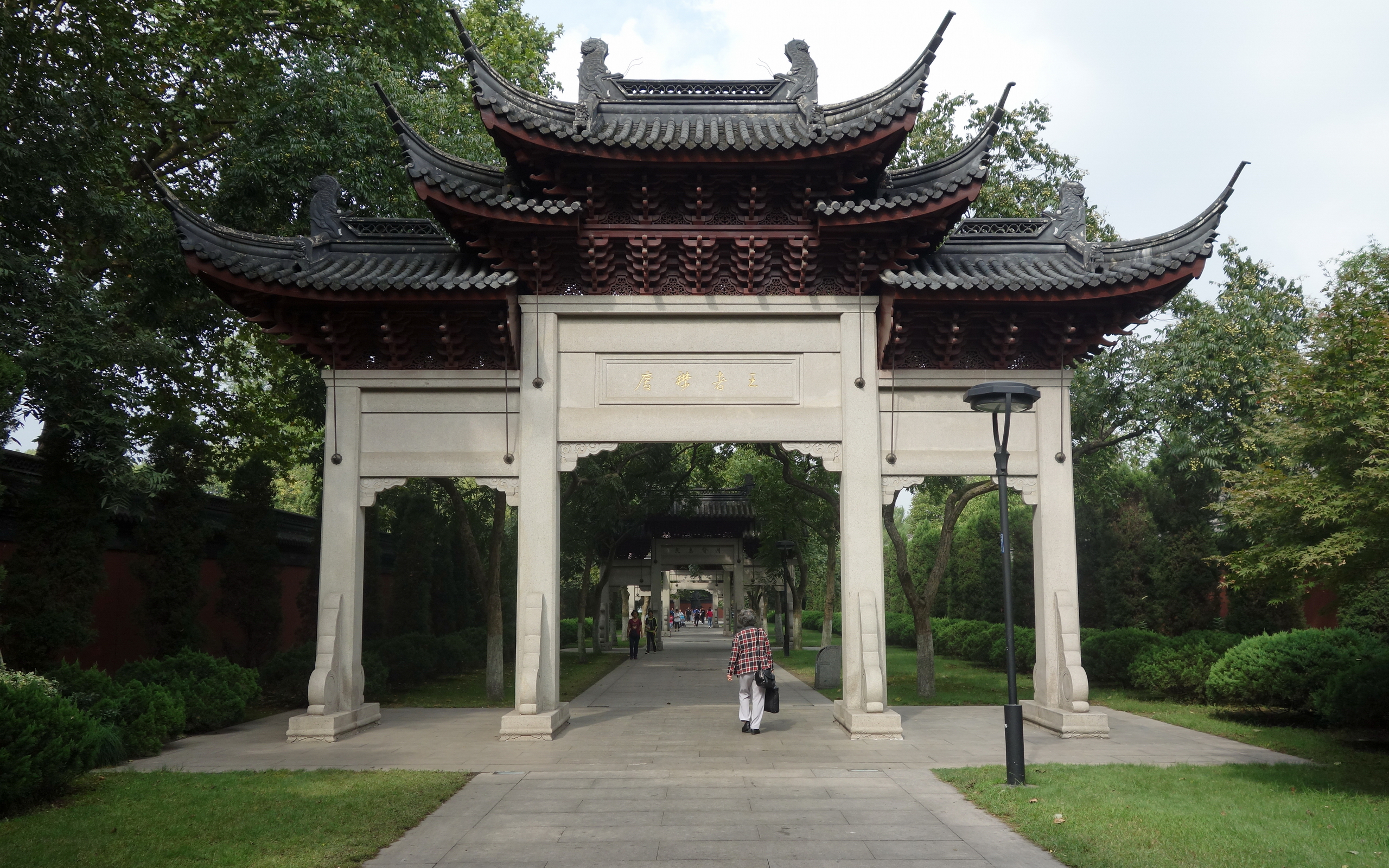
Paifangs at the West Lake, Hangzhou, China.

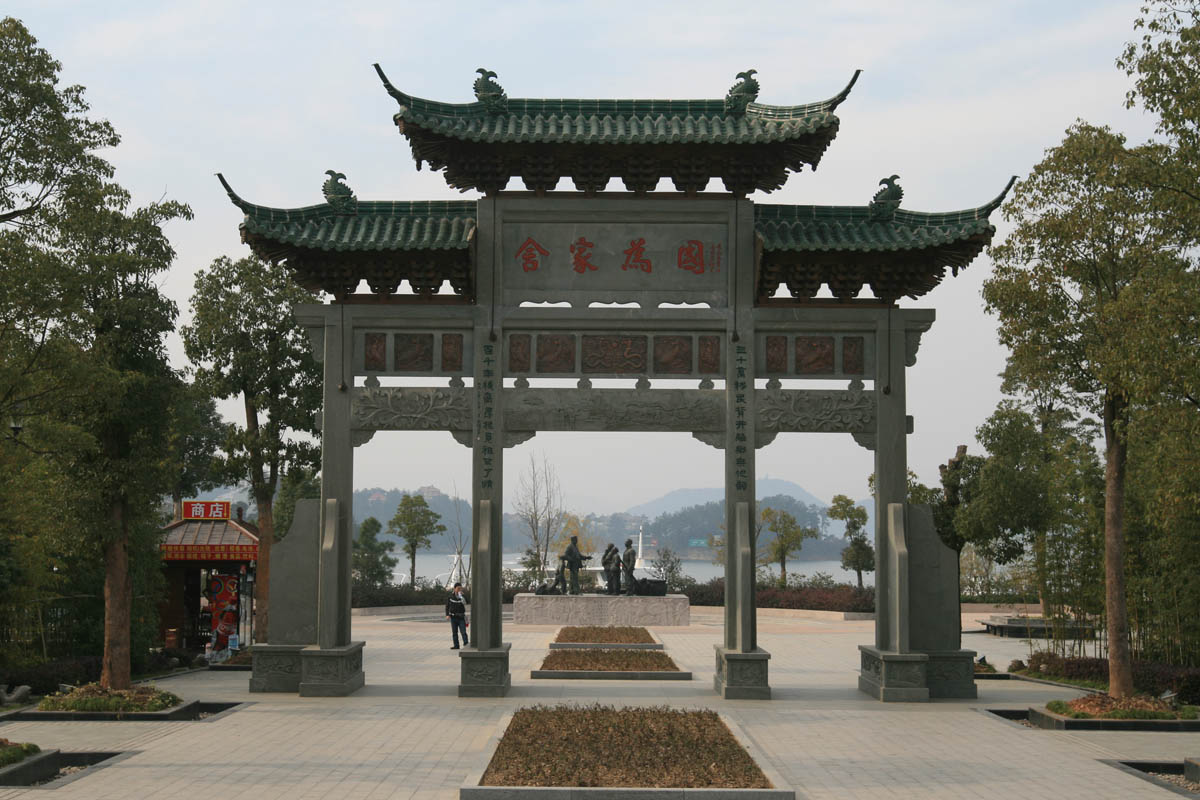
Pailou at the entrance to Qiandao Lake Scenic Area, Chun'an, Zhejiang

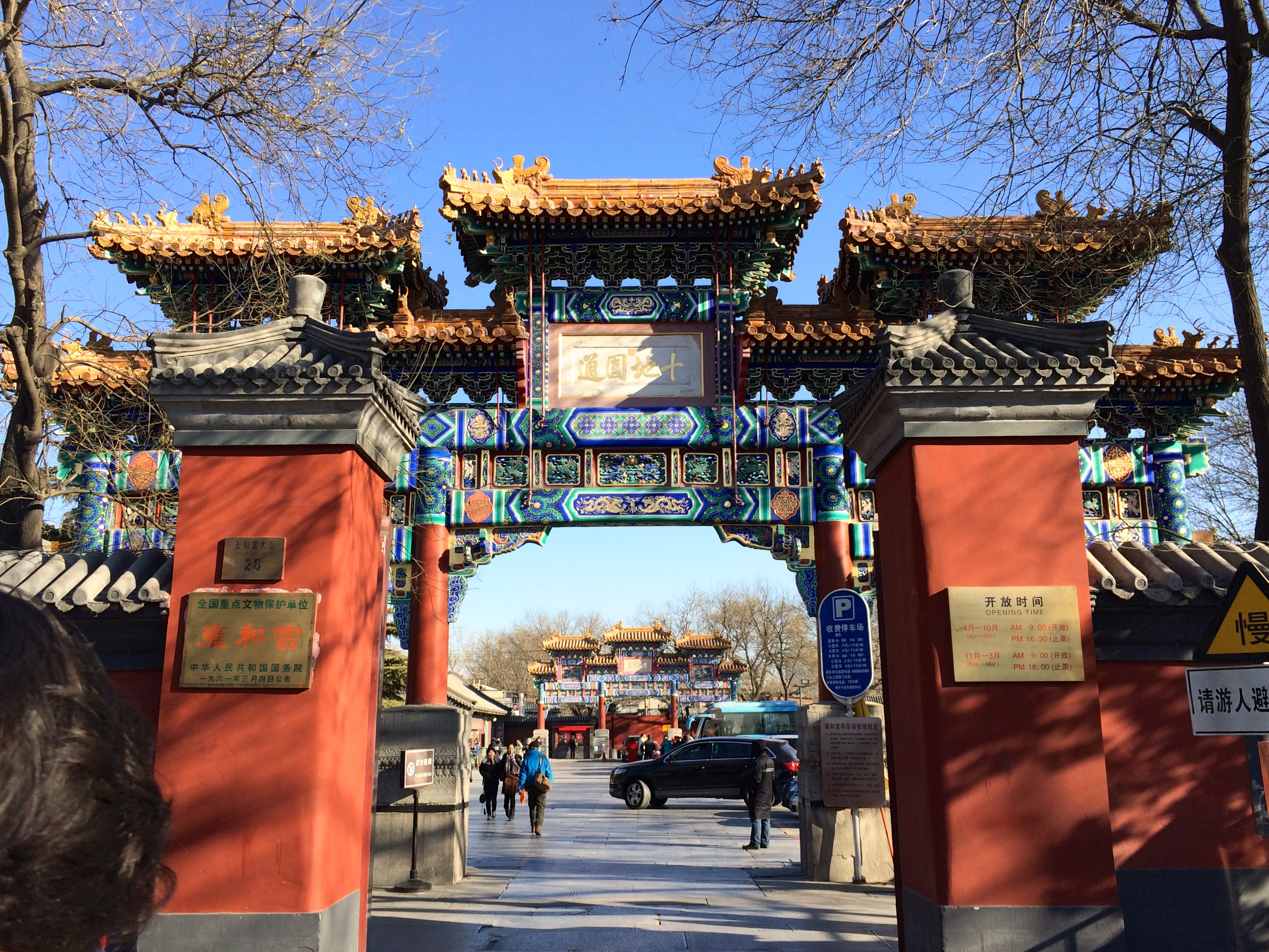
Paifangs at the entrance to Yonghe Temple, Beijing

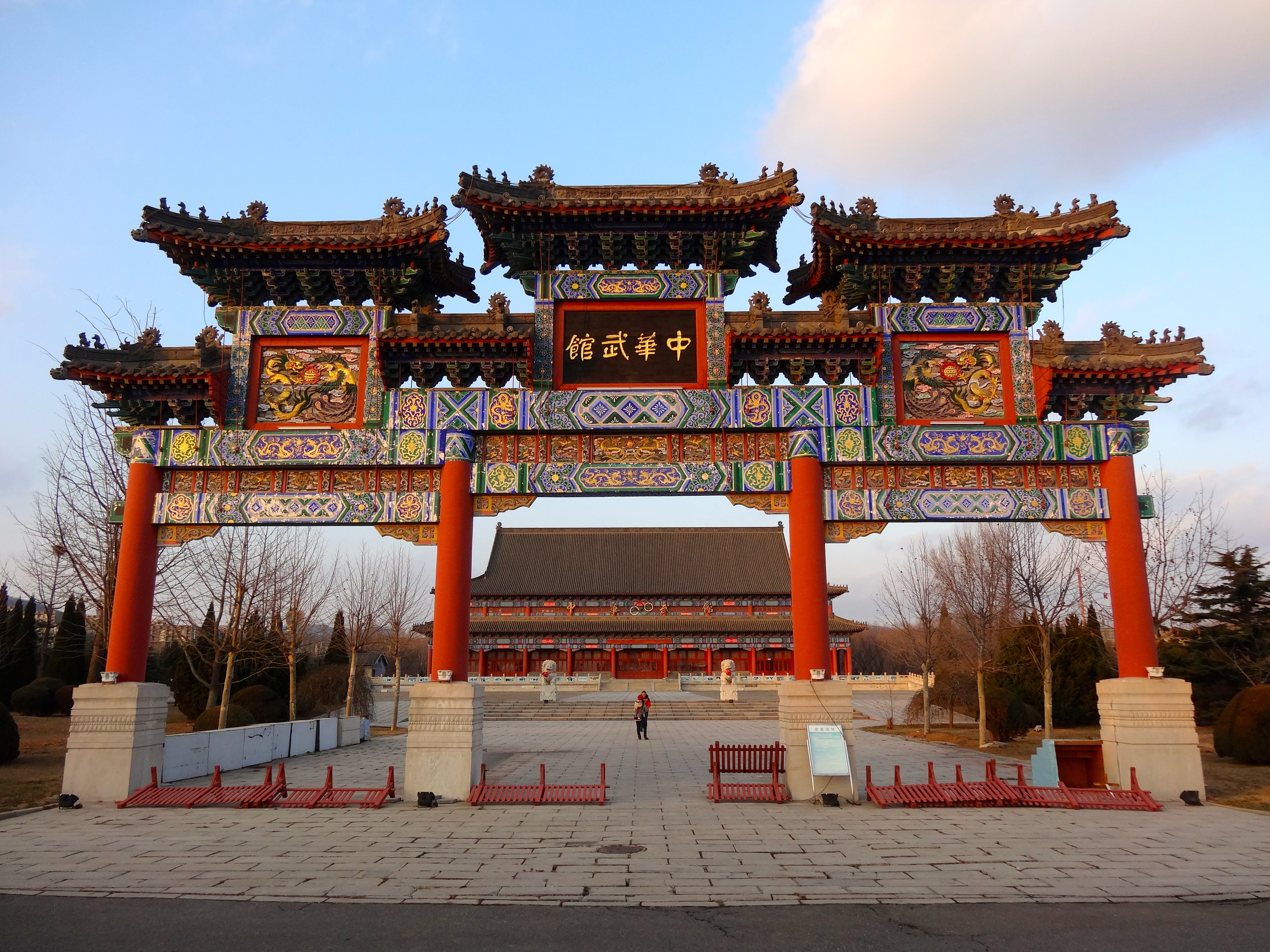
Pailou at the China Martial Arts Hall, Jinshitan, Dalian, Liaoning.

=== Greater China ===
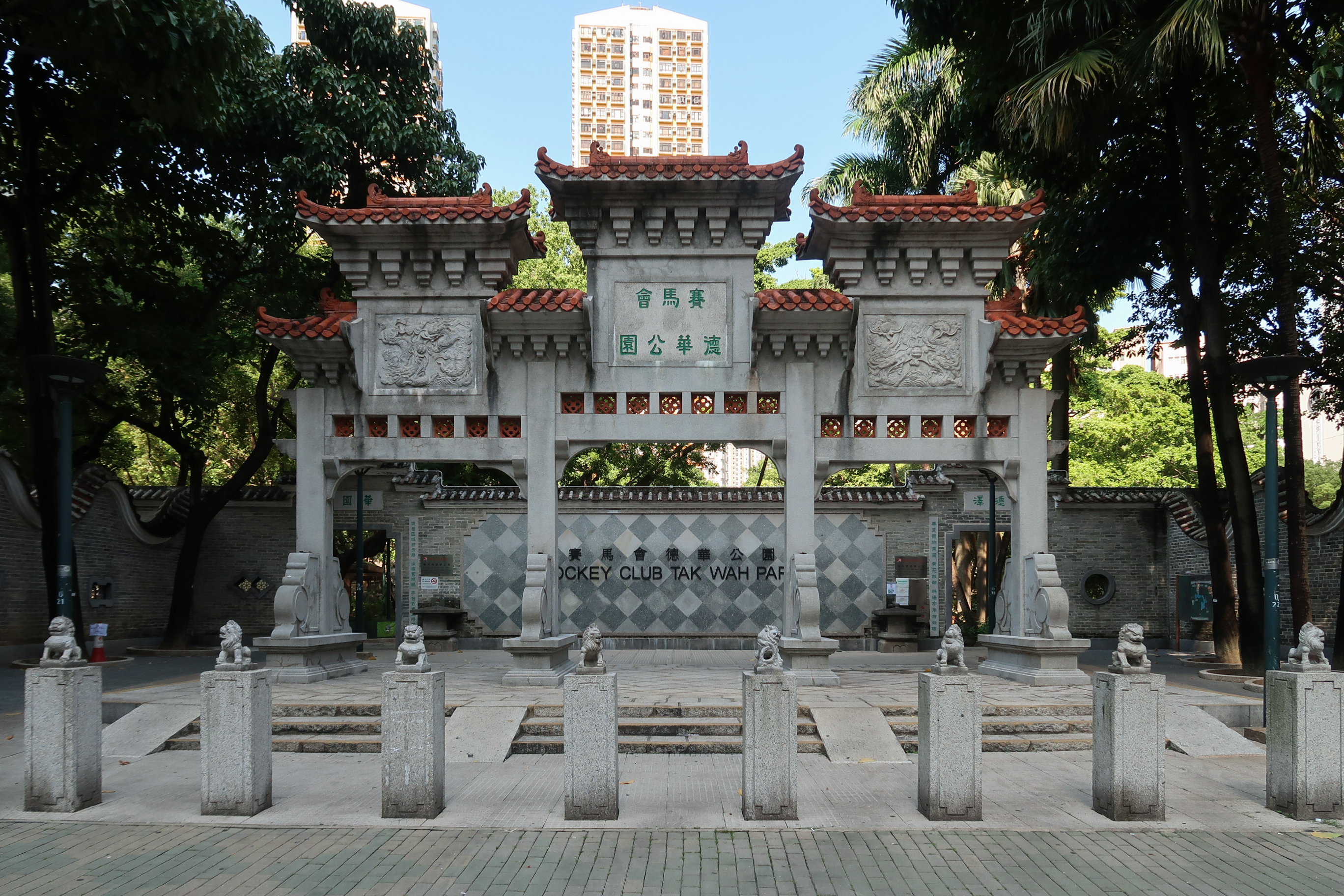
Jockey Club Tak Wah Park, Hong Kong

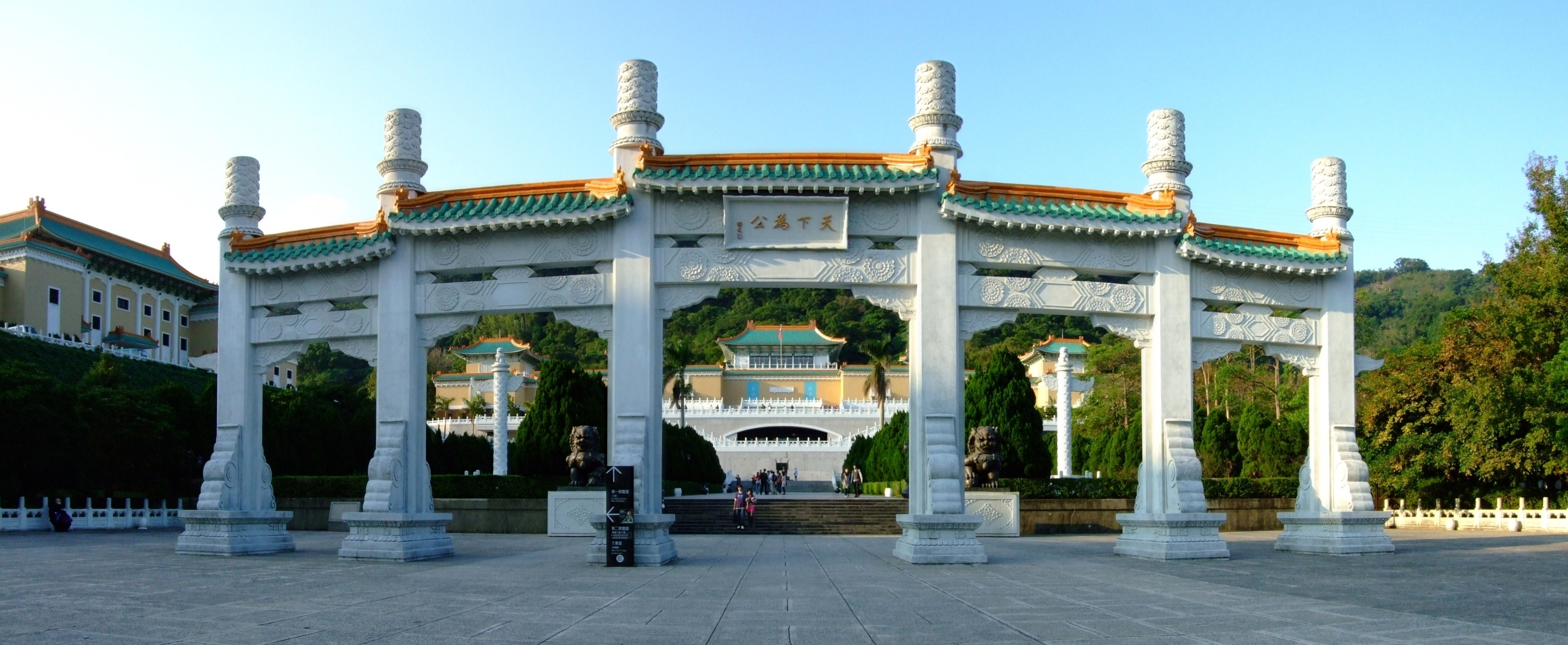
Paifang at the National Palace Museum in Taipei, Taiwan.

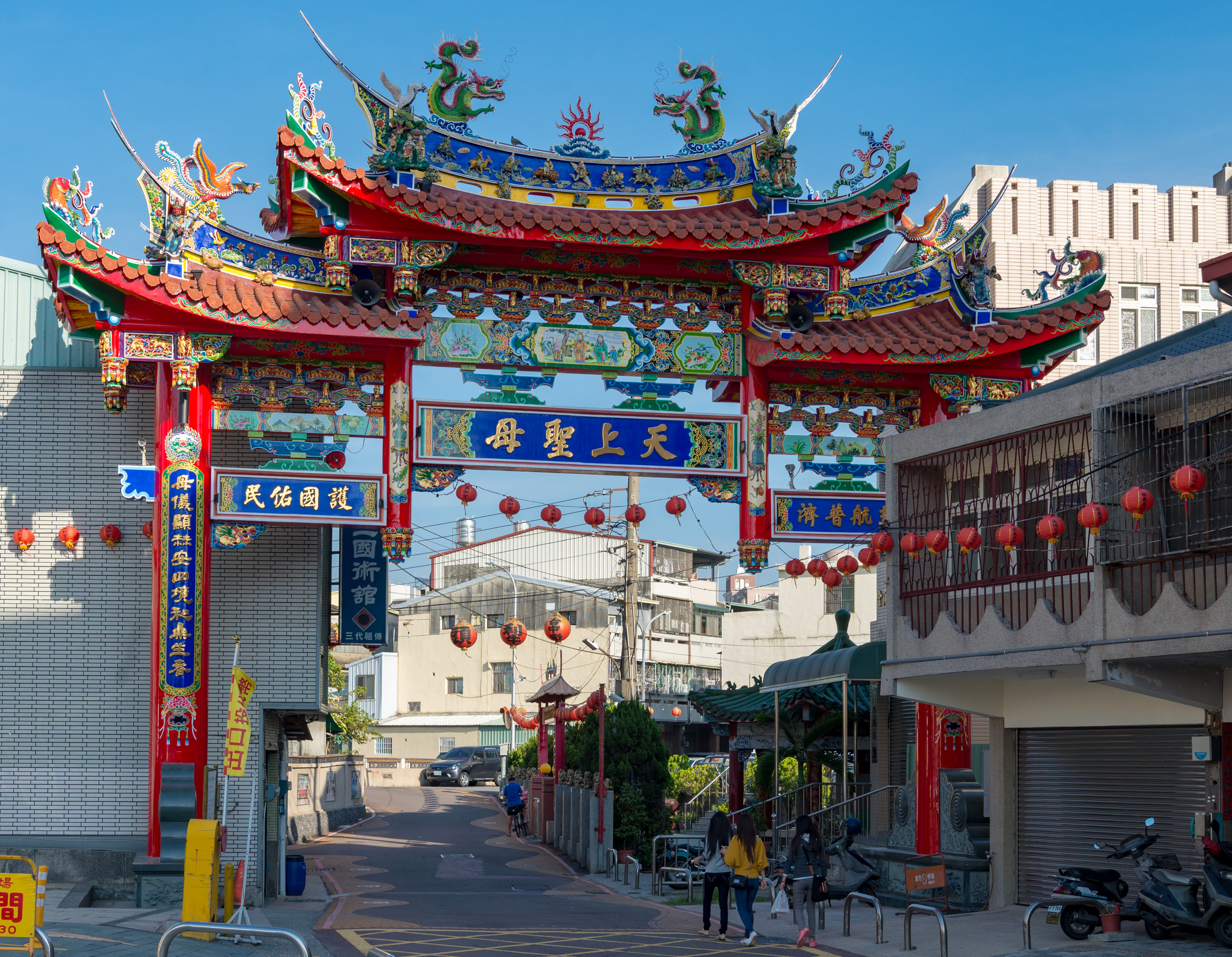
Paifang of the Wanhe Temple in Taichung, Taiwan.

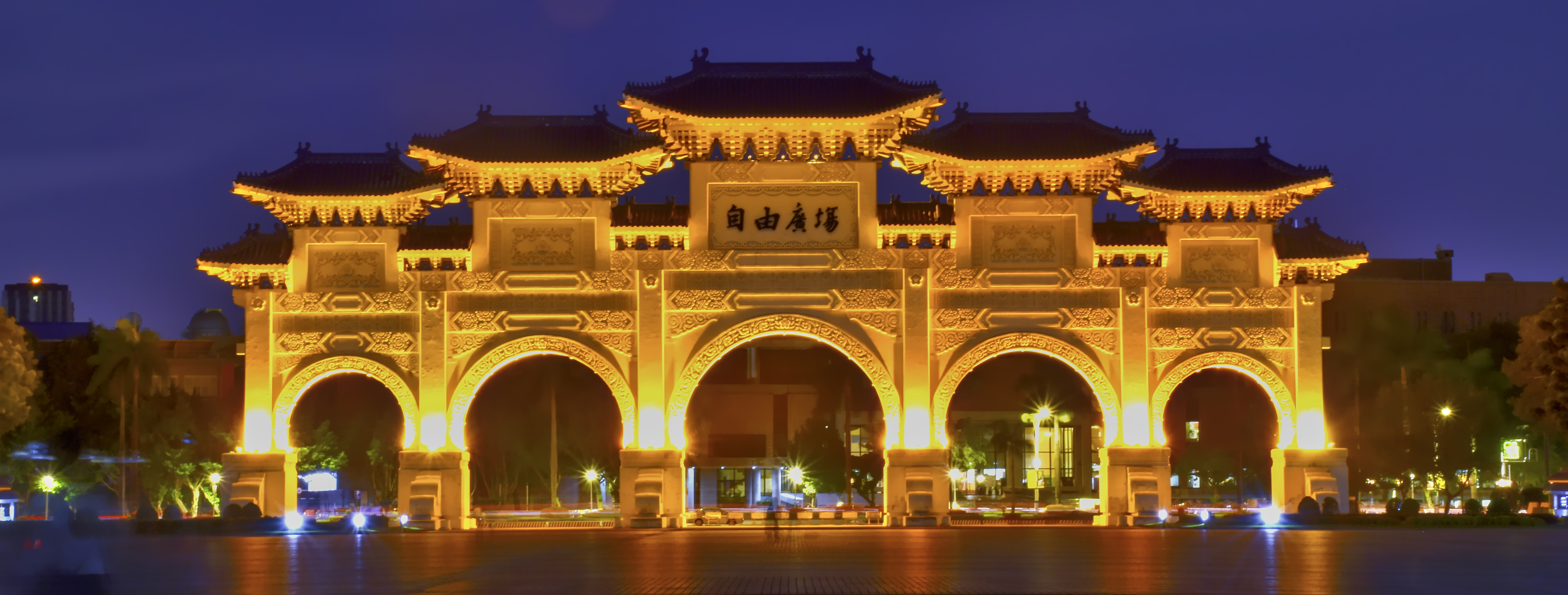
Paifang at Liberty Square, in Taipei, Taiwan. Looking west.

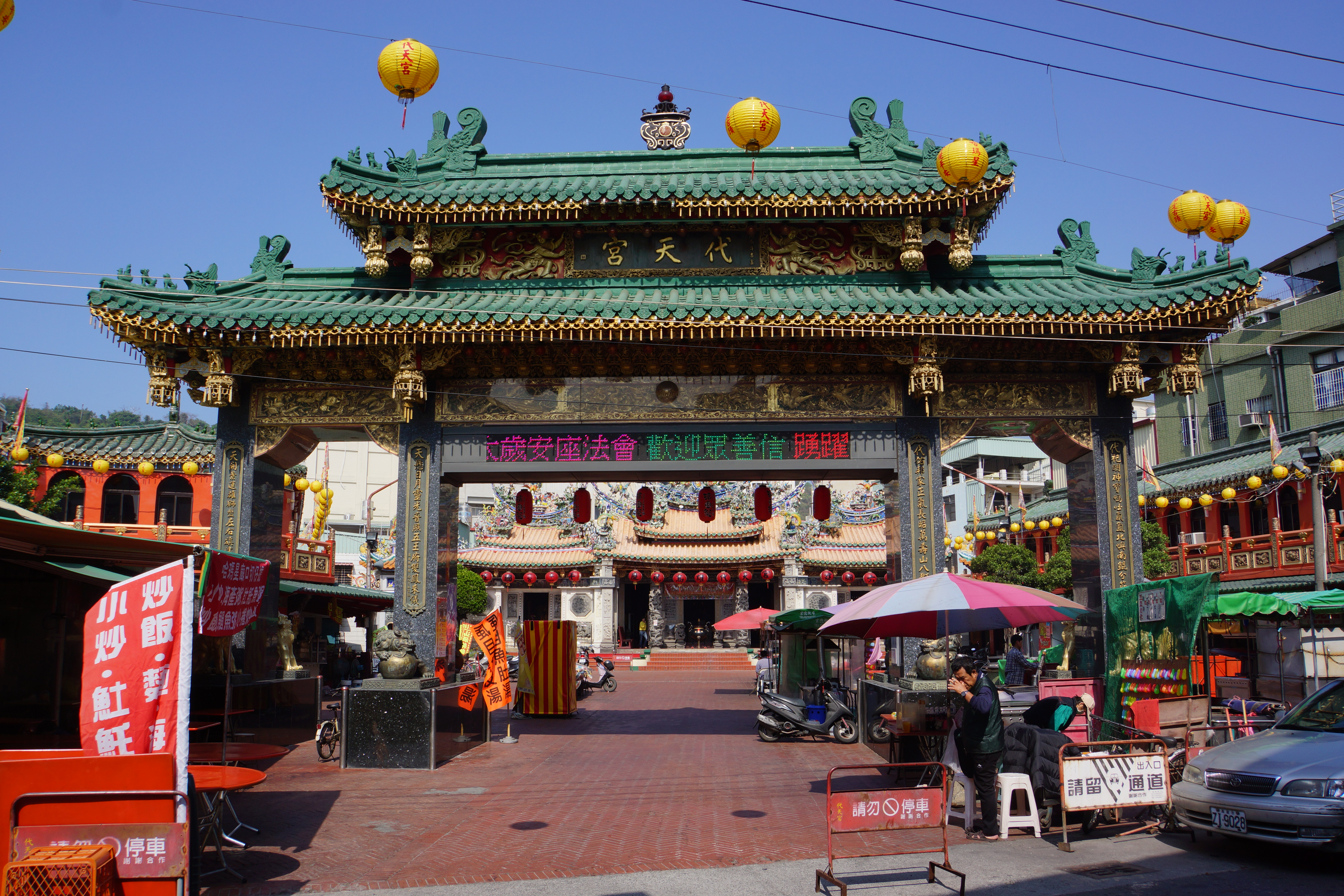
Paifang at Daitian Temple, Gushan District, Kaohsiung, Taiwan

=== Oversea ===
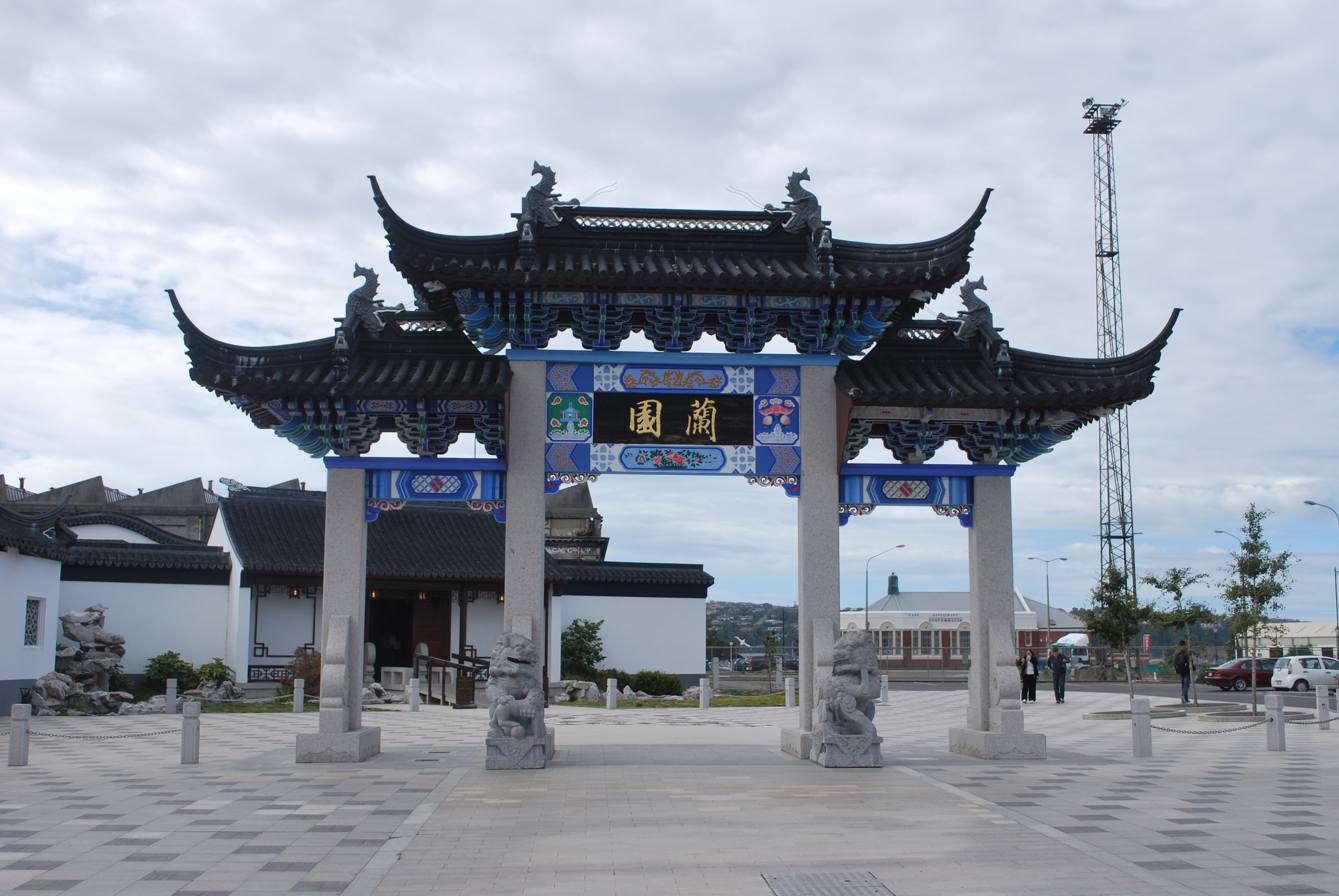
Pailou at Dunedin Chinese Garden, New Zealand.

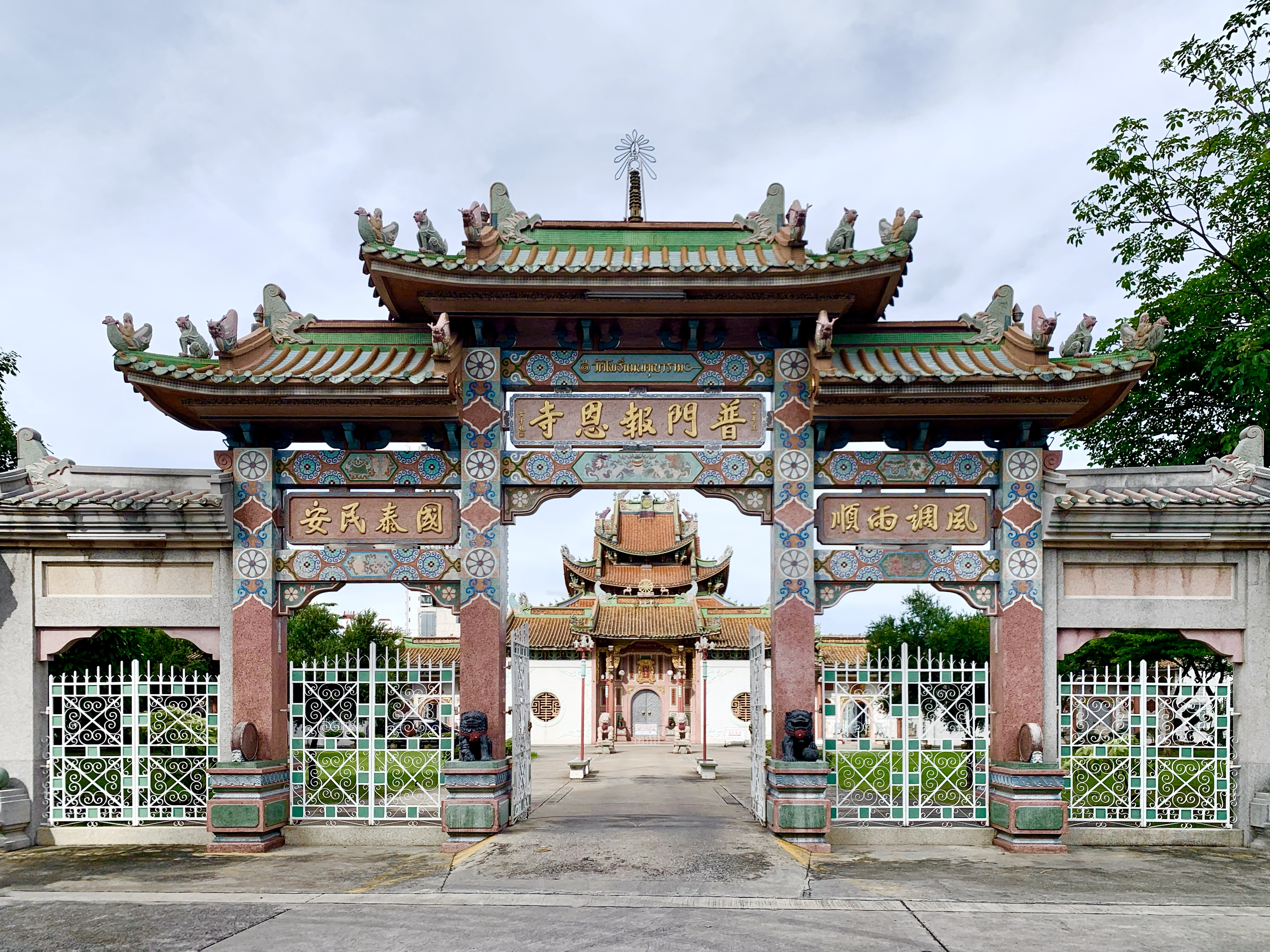
Paifang of Wat Pho Maen Khunaram, Yan Nawa, Bangkok, Thailand

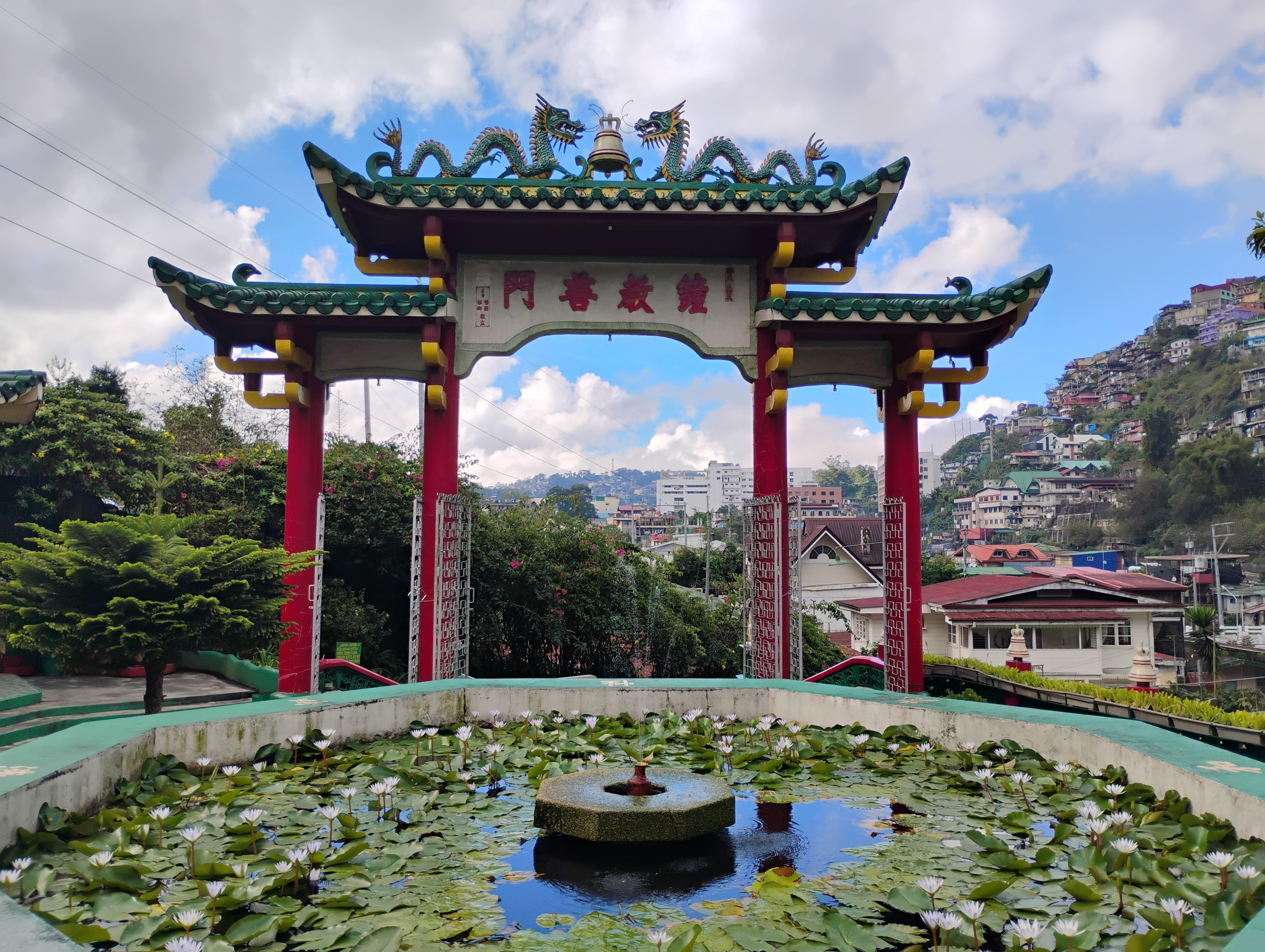
Bell Church, Baguio City, Philippines

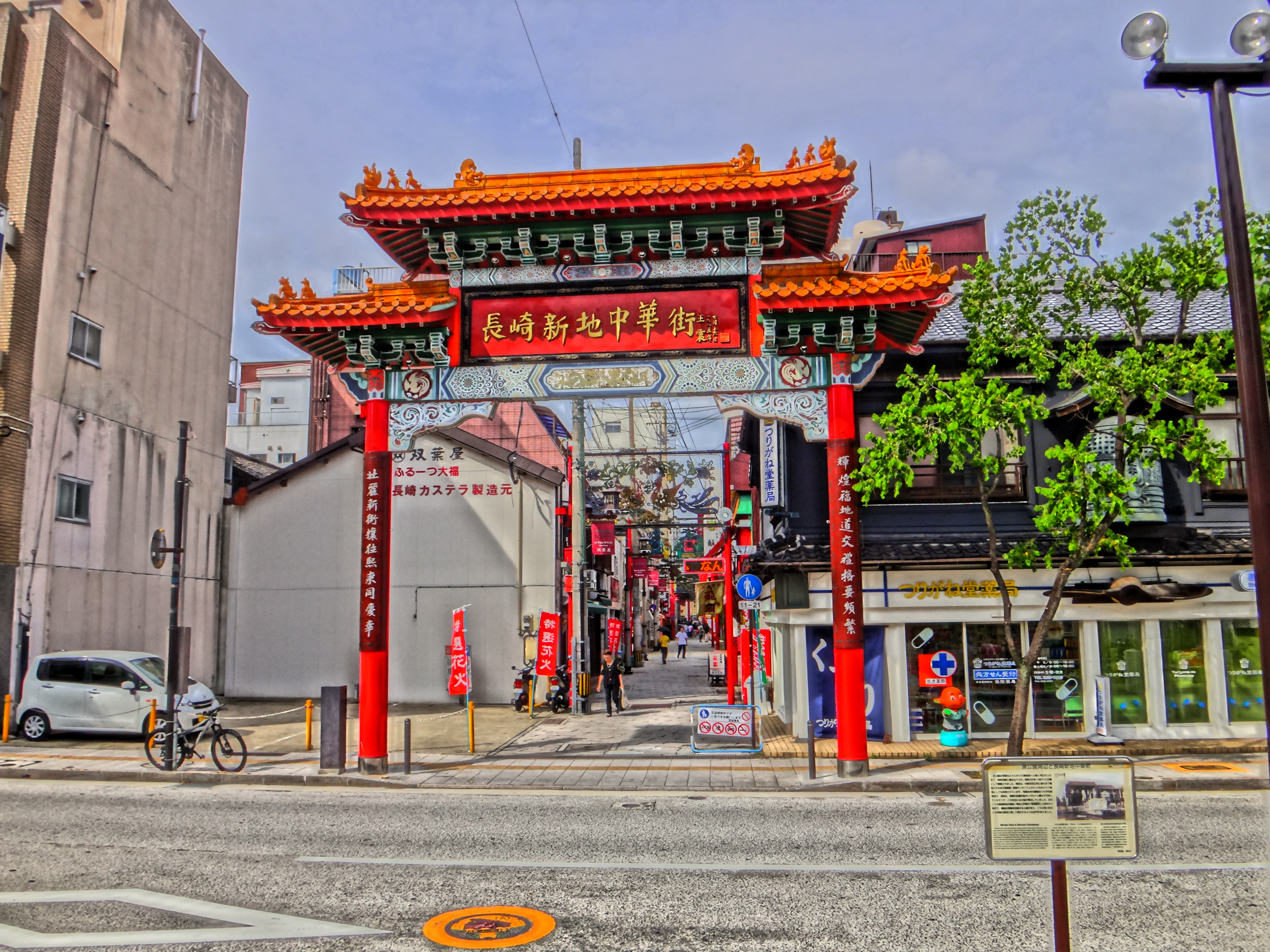
Shinchi Chinatown, Nagasaki, Japan

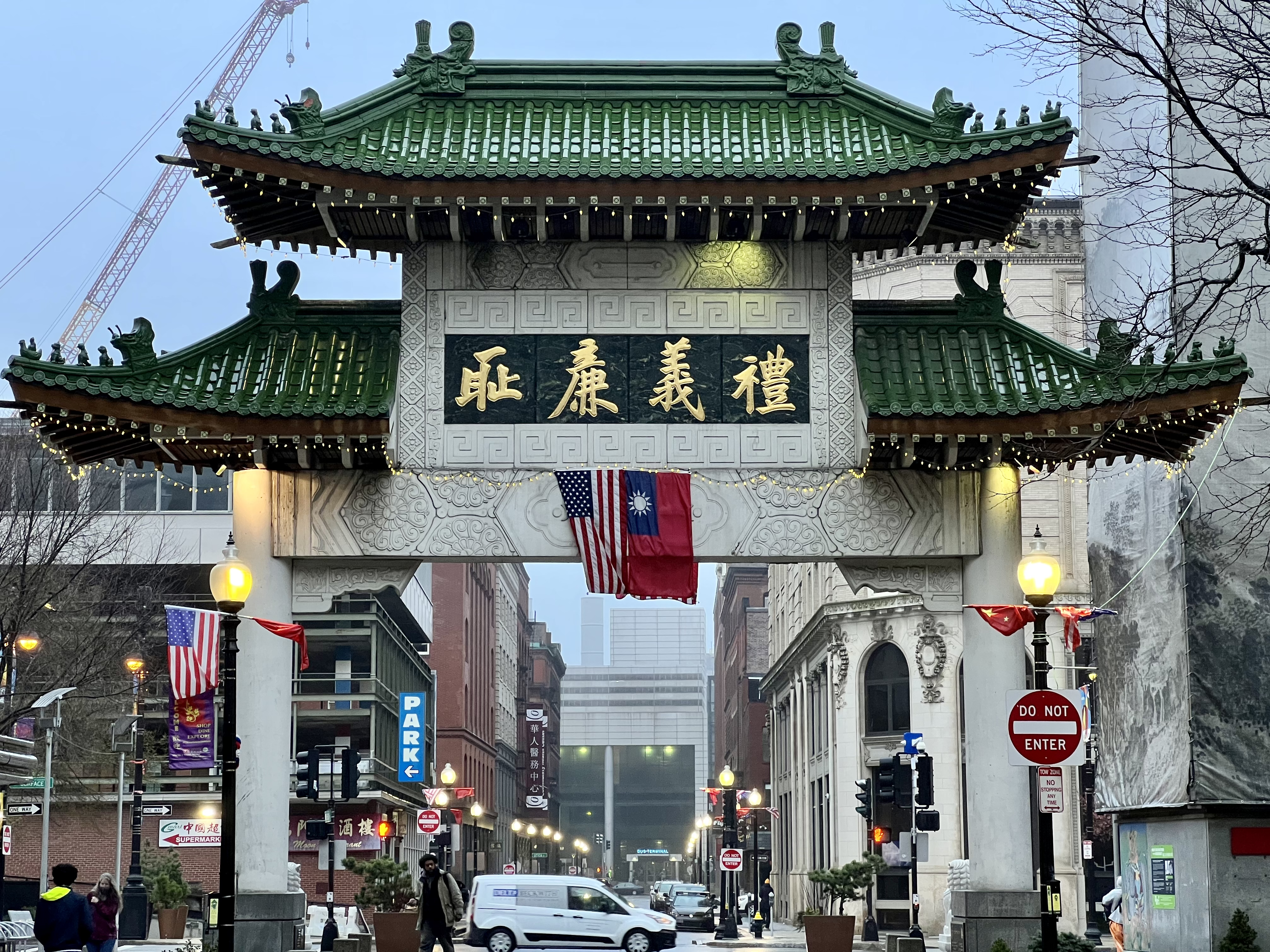
Paifang at the entrance to Boston Chinatown, Massachusetts

Friendship Archway in the Chinatown of Washington, D.C.

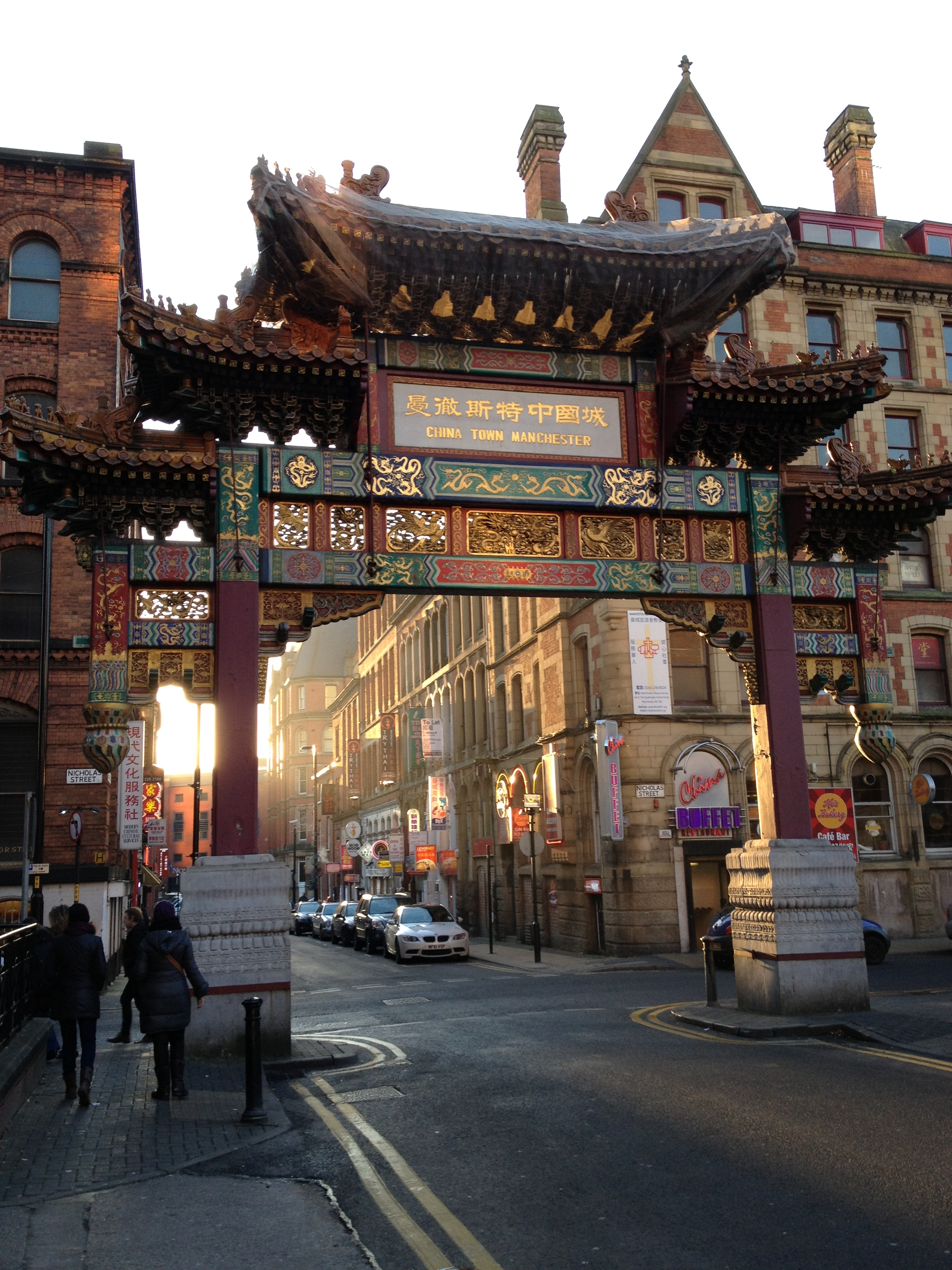
Manchester Chinatown, United Kingdom

== See also ==
- Chinatown gate
- Shanmen, gate of Chinese Buddhist temple
- Hongsalmun, in Korean architecture with both religious and other usage
- Iljumun, portal in Korean Buddhist temple architecture
- Tam quan, a Vietnamese Buddhist style of traditional gateway
- Trụ biểu, in Vietnamese temple architecture
- Torana, an Indian ceremonial arched gateway
- Torii, in Japanese Shinto shrine architecture
