= 55 Faulkner Street =

Listed building in Manchester, England

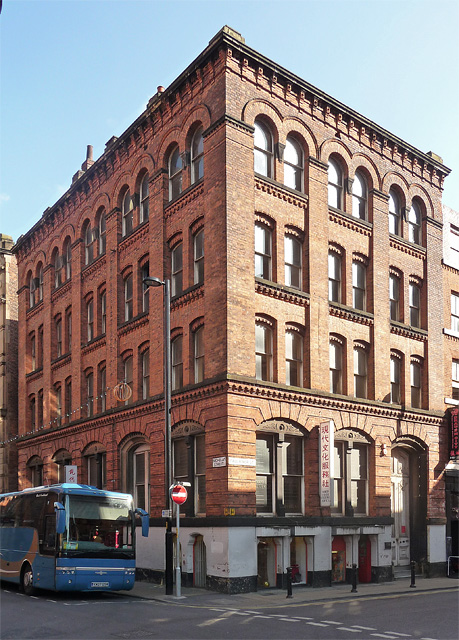
- Interactive map of the 55 Faulkner Street area

General information
- Coordinates: 53.478316°N 2.239910°W
- Year built: 1870

Technical details
- Floor count: 5 (incl. basement)

Design and construction
- Architecture firm: Clegg and Knowles
- Designations

Listed Building – Grade II
- Official name: 55, Faulkner Street, 18, Nicholas Street
- Designated: 6 June 1994
- Reference no.: 1217991

55 Faulkner Street (also 18 Nicholas Street) is a historic building in the Chinatown district of Manchester, England. Constructed in 1870, and Grade II listed in June 1994, it caught fire and was gutted in November 2016.

== History ==
Located in Chinatown, Manchester, close to Manchester's Chinese Arch, 55 Faulkner Street was originally constructed as a warehouse in 1870 by architects Clegg and Knowles. It is a rectangular corner building with a basement and four floors, with five bays facing Nicholas Street and three bays facing Faulkner Street. It was built of brown bricks with Flemish bond and sandstone dressings. It was later used as offices, and became a Grade II listed building on 6 June 1994.

=== 2016 fire ===
In the early hours of 25 November 2016, around 2.15am, the building caught fire. Over 50 firefighters were involved in extinguishing the fire. The building was gutted by the fire, with the roof collapsing in, and the building was deemed structurally unsafe. Staircases in the building had to be shored up before the remains of the building could be explored. The cause of the fire has not been established. No other buildings in the area were damaged.

The bodies of two men, James Evans and Wayne Bardsley, were recovered from the first floor of the building after the fire, thought to be homeless people, which sparked outcry amongst homeless charities and members of parliament about homelessness in Manchester. The building was known to have housed homeless people in the past, as the building had been unoccupied for some time. The police and fire service ran a joint investigation of the fire, and an arrest connected with the fire was made on 8 December 2016.

=== 2018 conversion ===
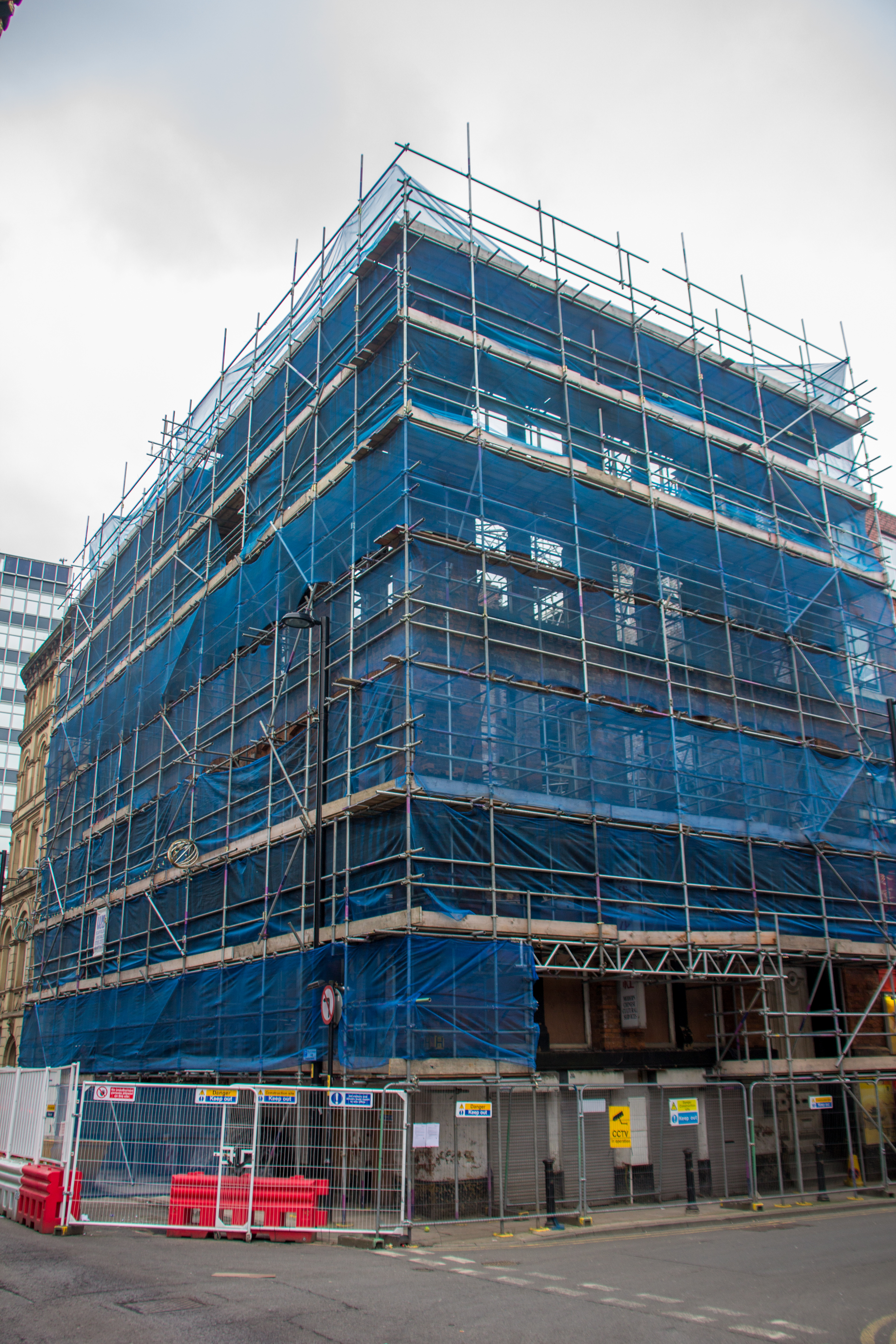
The building in January 2018 after the fire

In January 2018, it was announced that the building would be converted into flats, with a restaurant on the ground floor.

== See also ==
- Listed buildings in Manchester-M1
