= Chinatown, Manchester =

Coordinates: 53.4786°N 2.2401°W

Chinatown
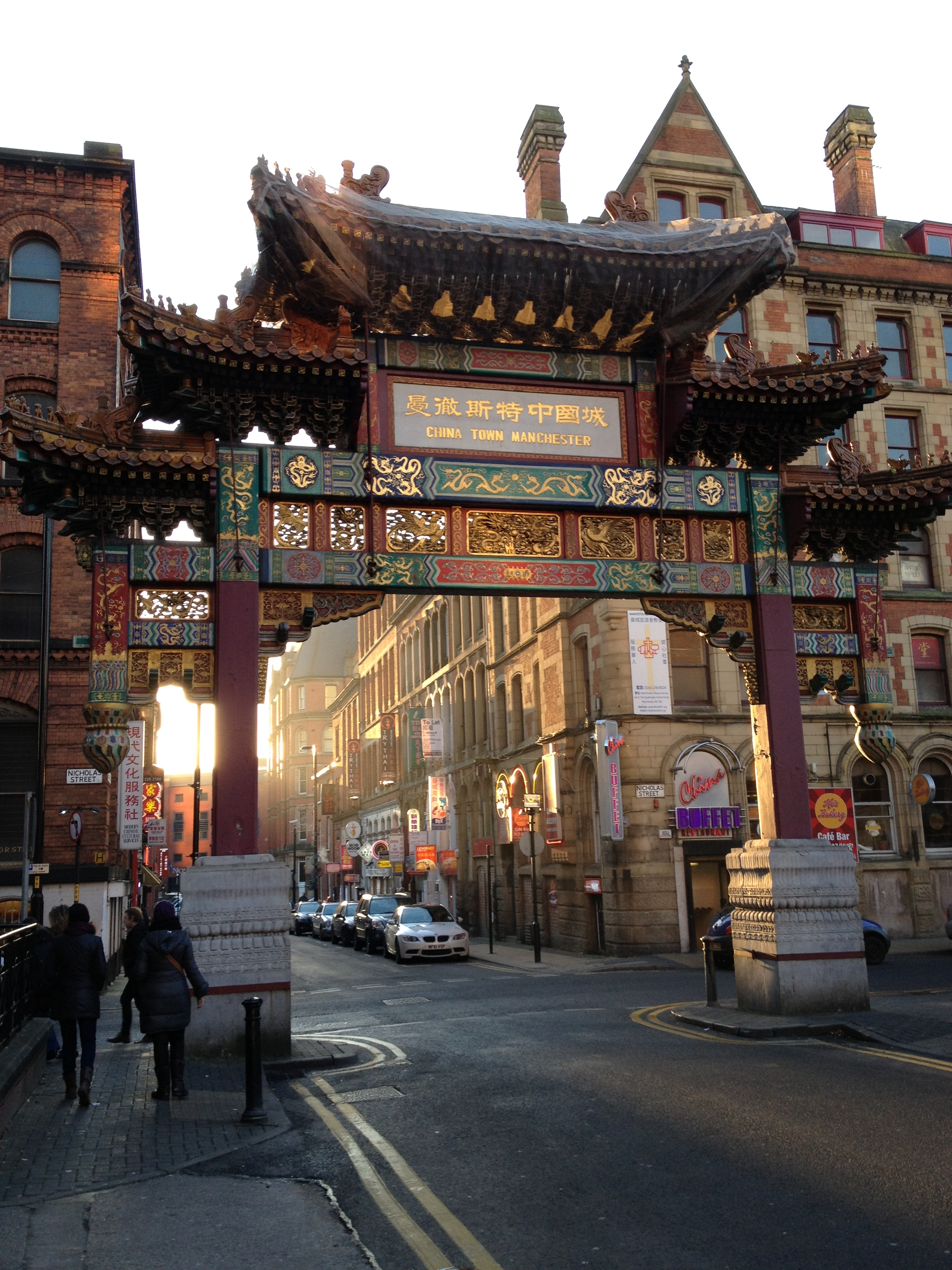
- Chinatown's Faulkner Street paifang
- Metropolitan borough: Manchester
- Metropolitan county: Greater Manchester
- Region: North West
- Country: England
- Sovereign state: United Kingdom
- Post town: MANCHESTER
- Postcode district: M1
- Dialling code: 0161
- Police: Greater Manchester
- Fire: Greater Manchester
- Ambulance: North West
- UK Parliament: Manchester Central

Manchester Chinatown
- Traditional Chinese: 曼徹斯特中國城
- Simplified Chinese: 曼彻斯特中国城
Transcriptions
Standard Mandarin
- Hanyu Pinyin: Mànchèsītè Zhōngguóchéng
Yue: Cantonese
- Yale Romanization: maahn chit sī dahk jūng gwok sìhng
- Jyutping: man^{6} cit^{3} si^{1} dak^{6} zung^{1} gwok^{3} sing^{4}

Alternative Chinese name
- Traditional Chinese: 曼徹斯特唐人街
- Simplified Chinese: 曼彻斯特唐人街
Transcriptions
Standard Mandarin
- Hanyu Pinyin: Mànchèsītè Tángrénjiē
Yue: Cantonese
- Yale Romanization: maahn chit sī dahk tòhng yàhn gāai
- Jyutping: man^{6} cit^{3} si^{1} dak^{6} tong^{4} jan^{4} gaai^{1}

Chinatown in Manchester, England, is the second largest Chinatown in the United Kingdom and the third largest in Europe. Its archway was completed in 1987 on Faulkner Street in Manchester city centre, which contains Chinese, Japanese, Korean, Nepali, Malaysian, Singaporean, Thai and Vietnamese restaurants, shops, bakeries and supermarkets.

== History ==
The first Chinese settlers arrived in the city in the early 20th century; many were engaged in the laundry trade. Manchester's first Chinese restaurant, Ping Hong, opened on Oxford Street in 1948. A Chinese immigration wave began in the 1950s, when there were severe labour shortages, and in response to the British Nationality Act 1948 which allowed easier access into the country. Hong Kong's rapid urbanisation also meant that farmers' traditional homes were being destroyed by urban sprawl, so many decided to migrate.

Chinese restaurants multiplied after the immigration boom. By the 1970s other Chinese businesses had opened, such as medicine shops, supermarkets and financial and legal services serving the area, including a Hong Kong government office and branch of The Hongkong and Shanghai Banking Corporation. In 1989, the Chinese Arts Centre opened in Chinatown. In 2013, the Bank of East Asia opened their first Manchester branch on Charlotte Street in Chinatown.

== Geography ==
Chinatown is a small area of Manchester's city centre. Its boundaries form a rectangle, surrounded by Mosley Street, Manchester Art Gallery and the Portico Library to the west, Portland Street to the east, Princess Street to the south, and Charlotte Street to the north. However, these boundaries are not official; some maps extend Chinatown further south to Oxford Street. To the east lies the city's gay village, centred on Canal Street, and to the north lies Piccadilly Gardens. Being in the city centre, the area is entirely urbanised. Unlike Manchester city centre as a whole, Chinatown's streets appear largely in a grid plan.

== Landmarks ==
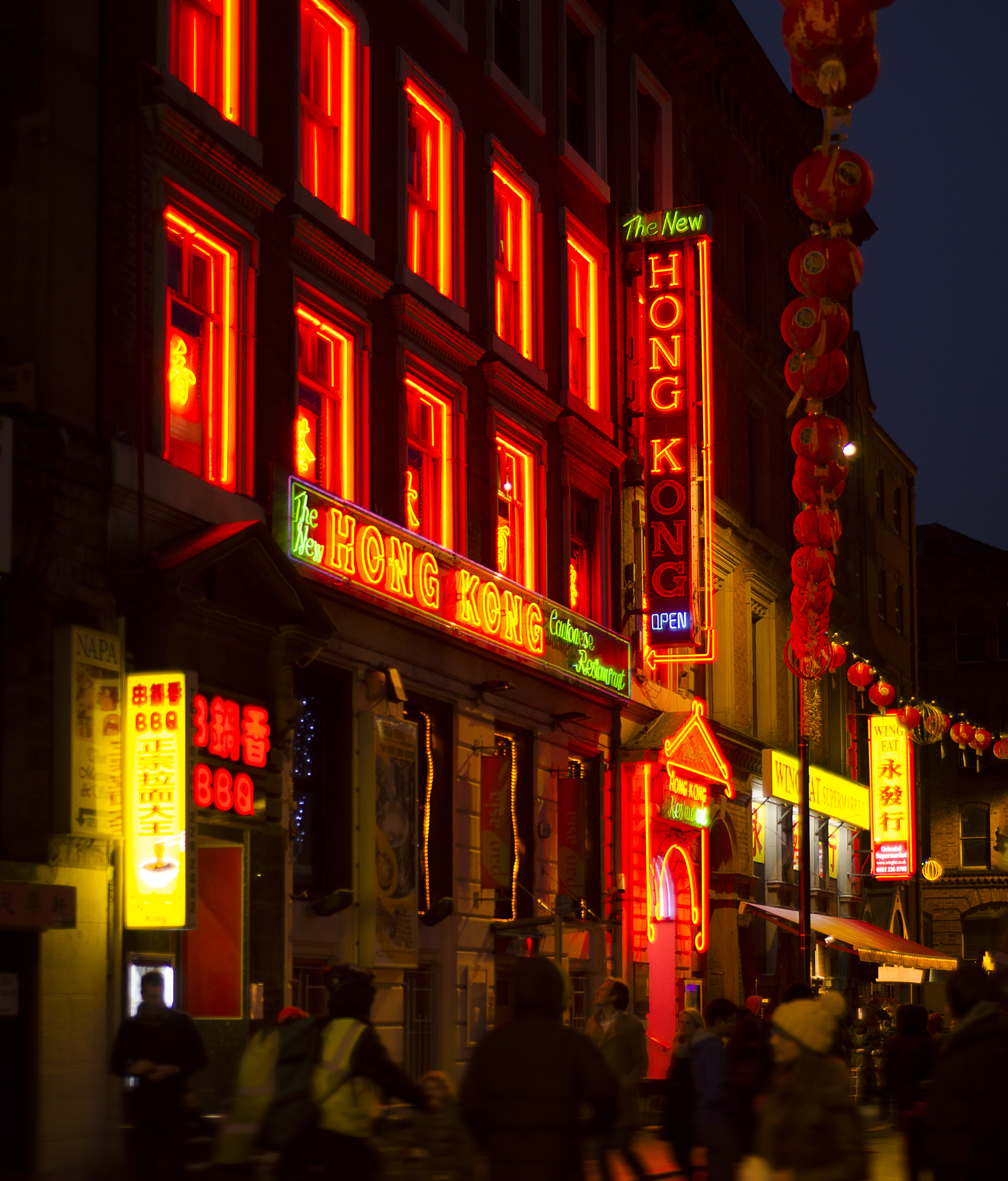
Chinatown at night

One of Chinatown's most noticeable landmarks is the archway on Faulkner Street. The paifang, underneath which road traffic passes, was specially built in China and shipped over in three containers. Construction commenced over Christmas 1986 and was completed by Easter 1987, a year after the city of Manchester was twinned with Wuhan. The structure was a gift from Manchester City Council to the Chinese community, and is adorned with dragons and phoenixes.

After many years exposed to the elements, the arch required restoration work to be undertaken; netting was wrapped around a part of the structure to prevent further tiles from dislodging. The Manchester Chinatown Community Group undertook a series of charity events, including a dry land dragon boat race in June 2012. In early 2013 the archway was repaired by Manchester and Cheshire Construction Company.

Another Chinatown landmark is the Guardian telephone exchange. The building is now owned by BT and used for communications work, though it was constructed for an entirely different usage. The building lies atop an underground bunker, constructed between 1949 and 1954 and paid for by NATO. The bunker was a fallout shelter designed to protect officials in the event of an atomic bomb and features over four miles of tunnels. The media were banned from revealing the bunker's existence until 1967 and it was built by Polish workers who could not speak English.

Chinatown has a number of listed buildings, including 55 Faulkner Street, Manchester and 36 Princess Street, an aparthotel for national chain Roomzzz.

== Transport ==
The area's nearest Metrolink stations are Piccadilly Gardens (which is also a bus interchange), and St Peter's Square tram stop. The nearest National Rail stations are Manchester Oxford Road to the south and Manchester Piccadilly to the east of Chinatown, the latter of which can be reached by Metrolink services. Furthermore, there is a car park off Faulkner Street for visitors driving into Chinatown in private vehicles. It is decorated in an oriental theme, in keeping with Chinatown, and a mural of a junk, a Chinese sea vessel, is contained within a brick wall overlooking the car park.

== Gallery ==
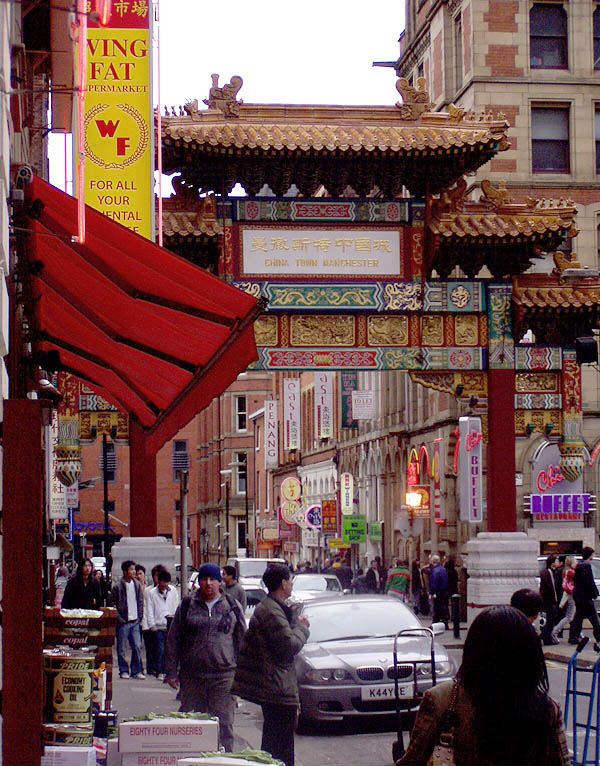
Chinatown in 2006

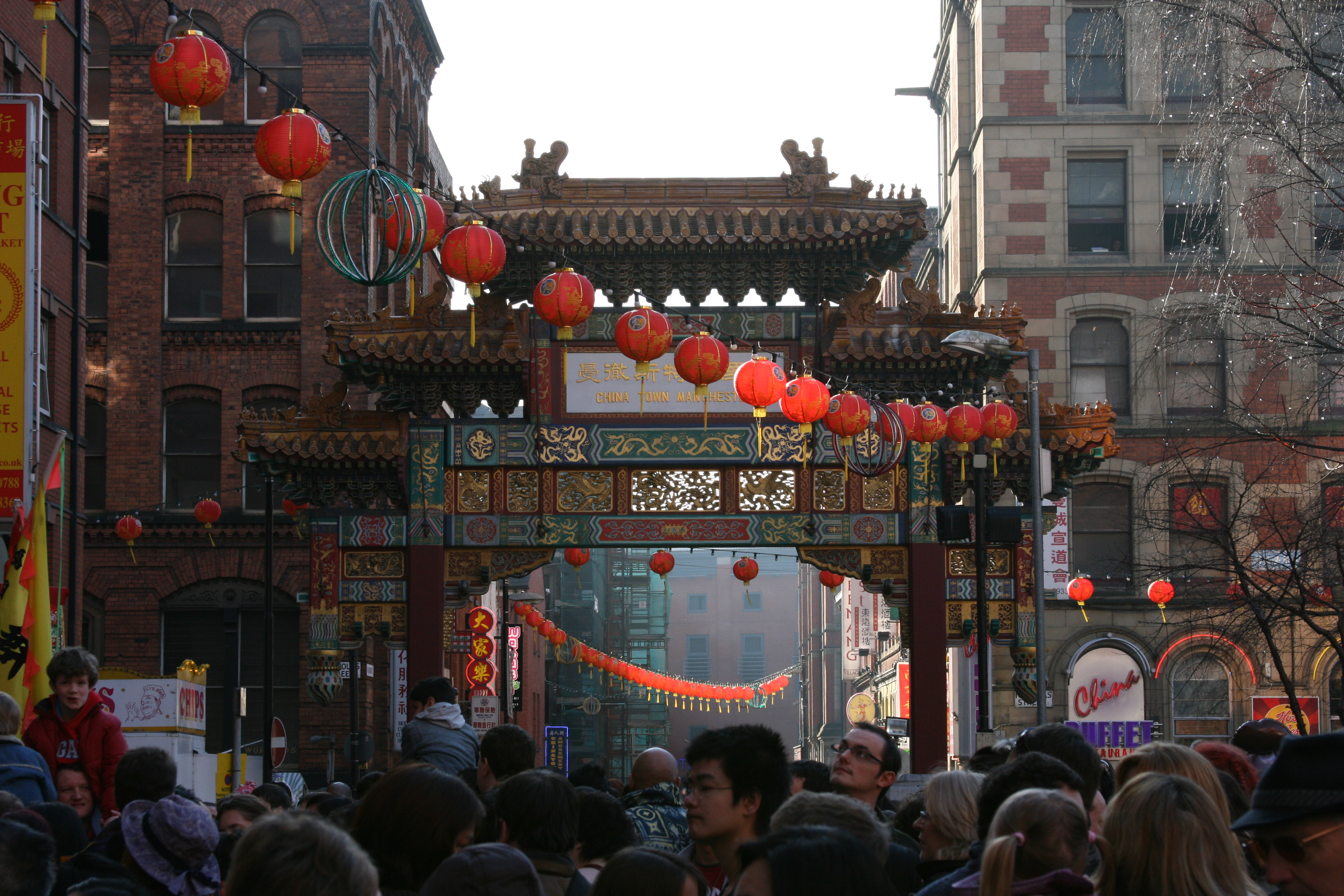
Celebrations at Chinese New Year, 2008

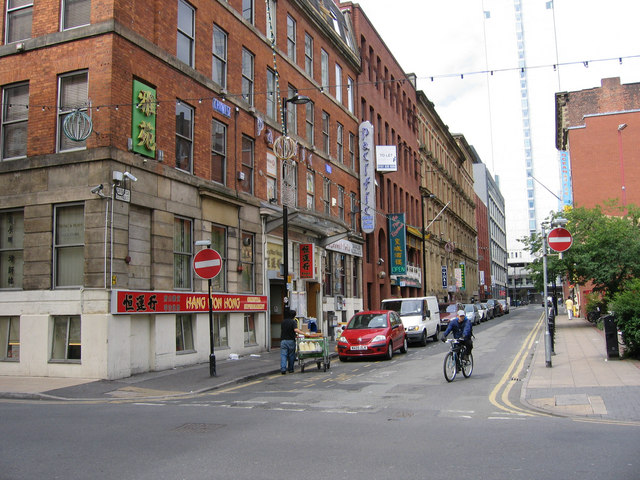
George Street, Chinatown

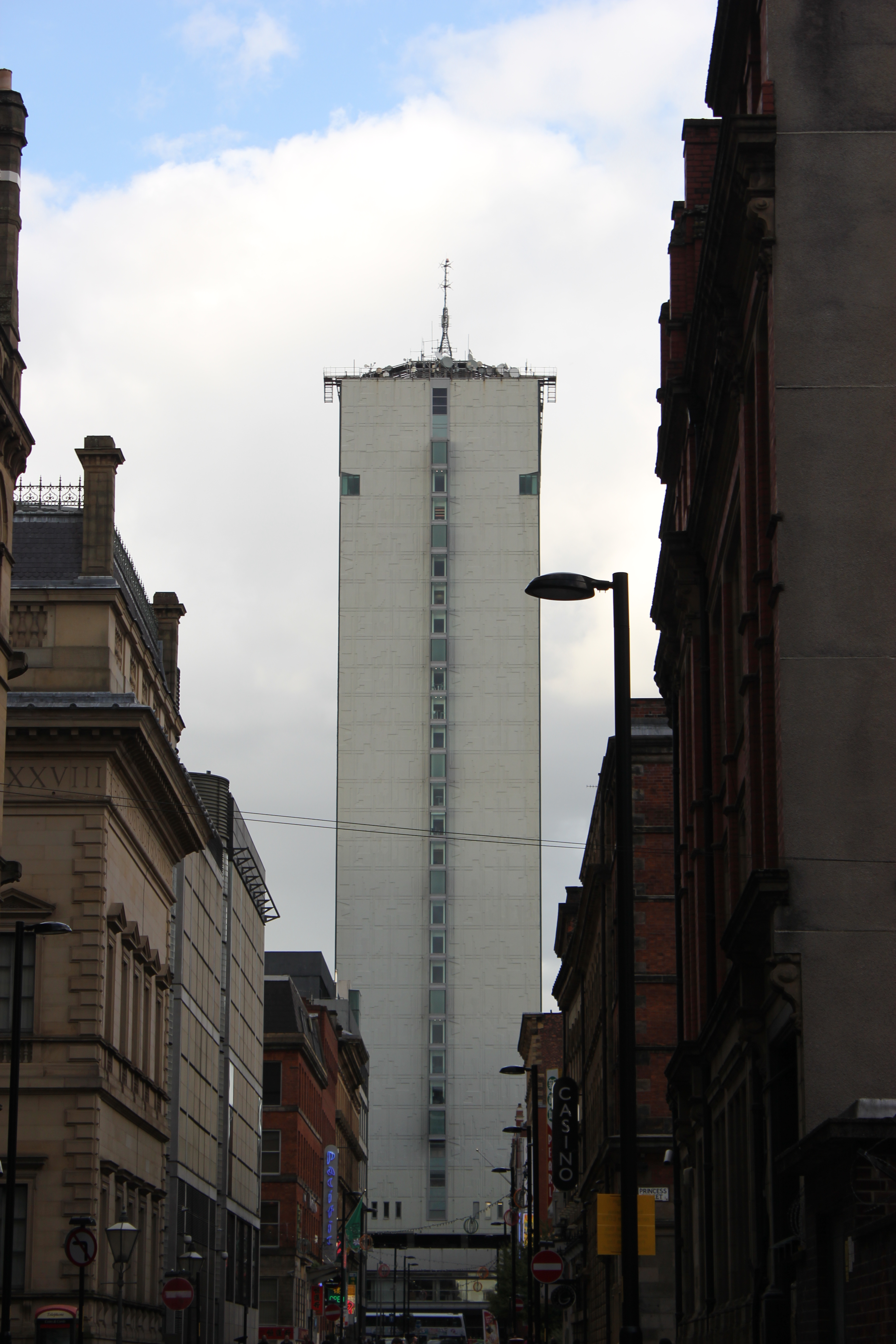
City Tower, as seen from George Street
