= Chinatown, Washington, D.C. =

Chinatown
- Neighborhood of Washington, D.C.
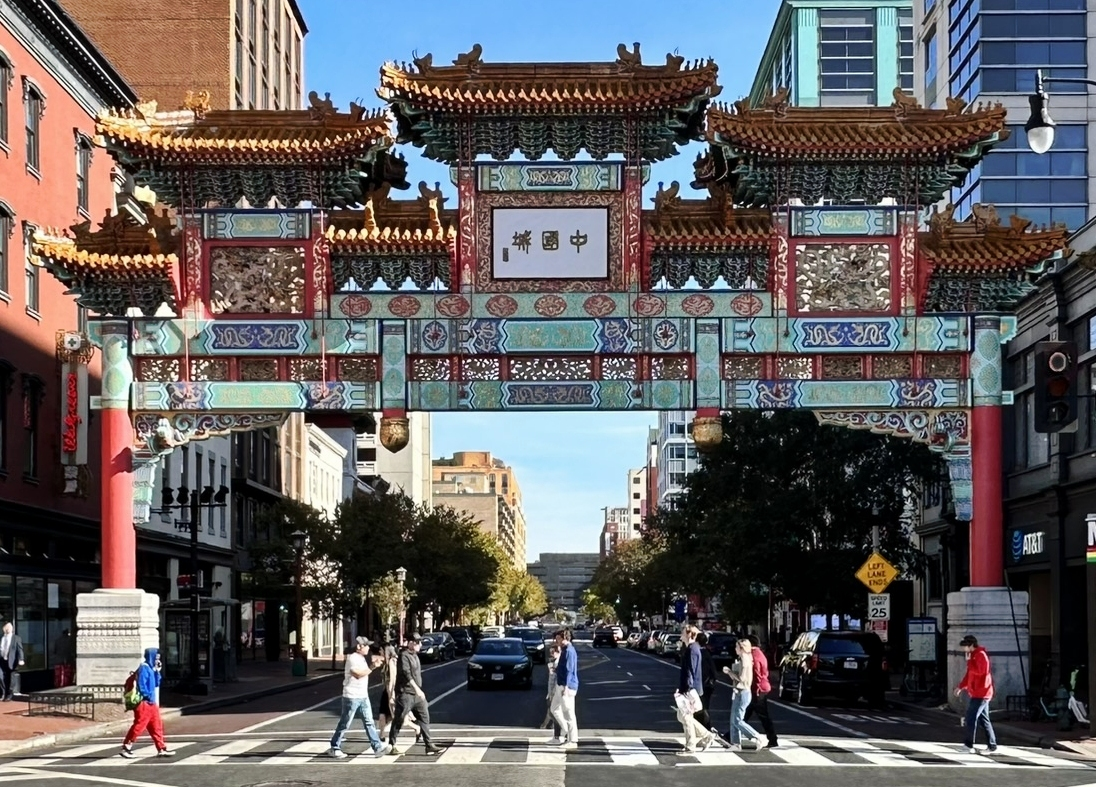
- Chinatown's Friendship Archway, as seen looking east on H Street NW in November 2023

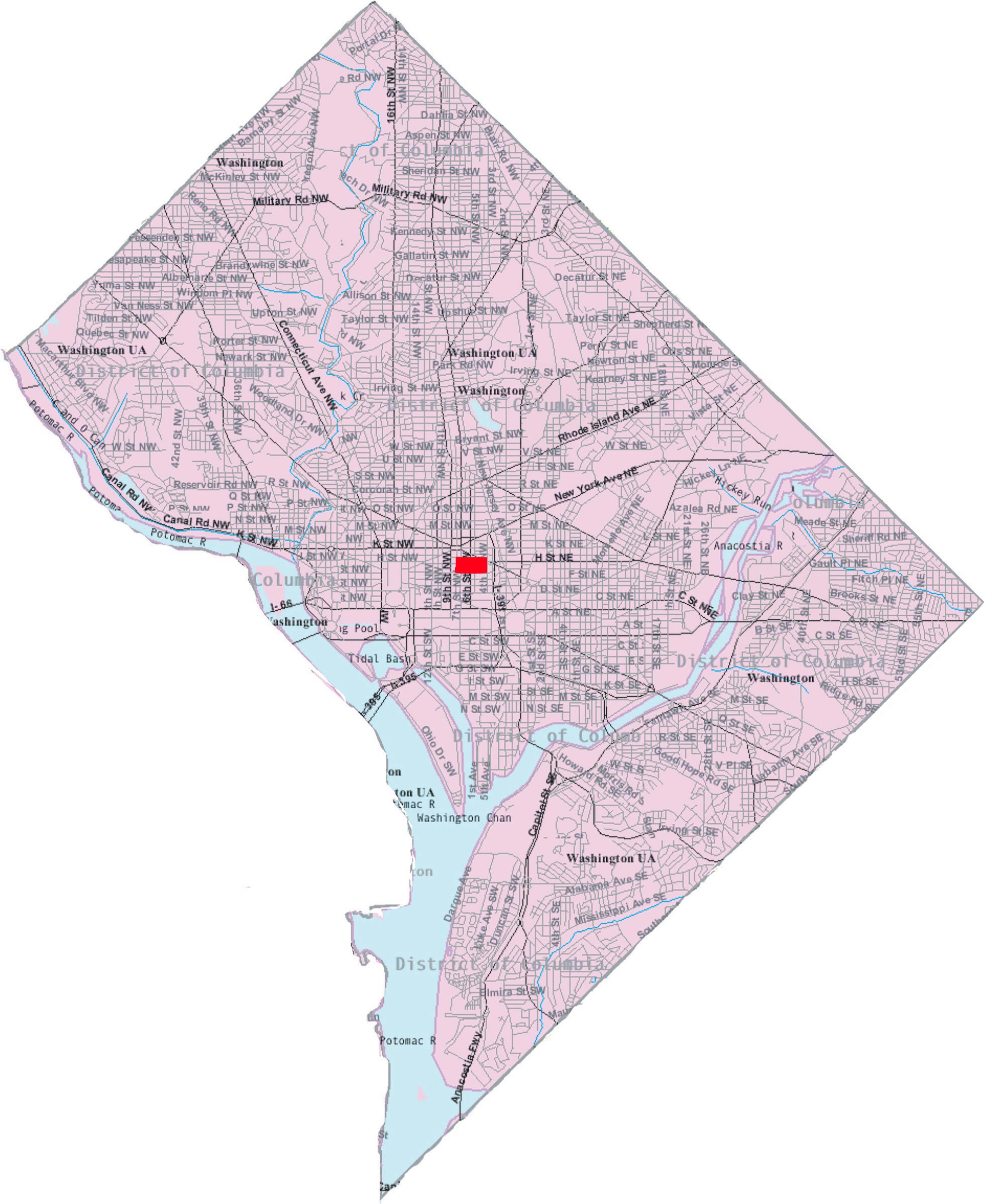
- Chinatown within the District of Columbia
- Coordinates: 38.8998°N 77.0217°W
- Country: United States
- District: Washington, D.C.
- Ward: Ward 2

Government
  - Councilmember: Brooke Pinto
- ZIP Code: 20001
- Area code: 202

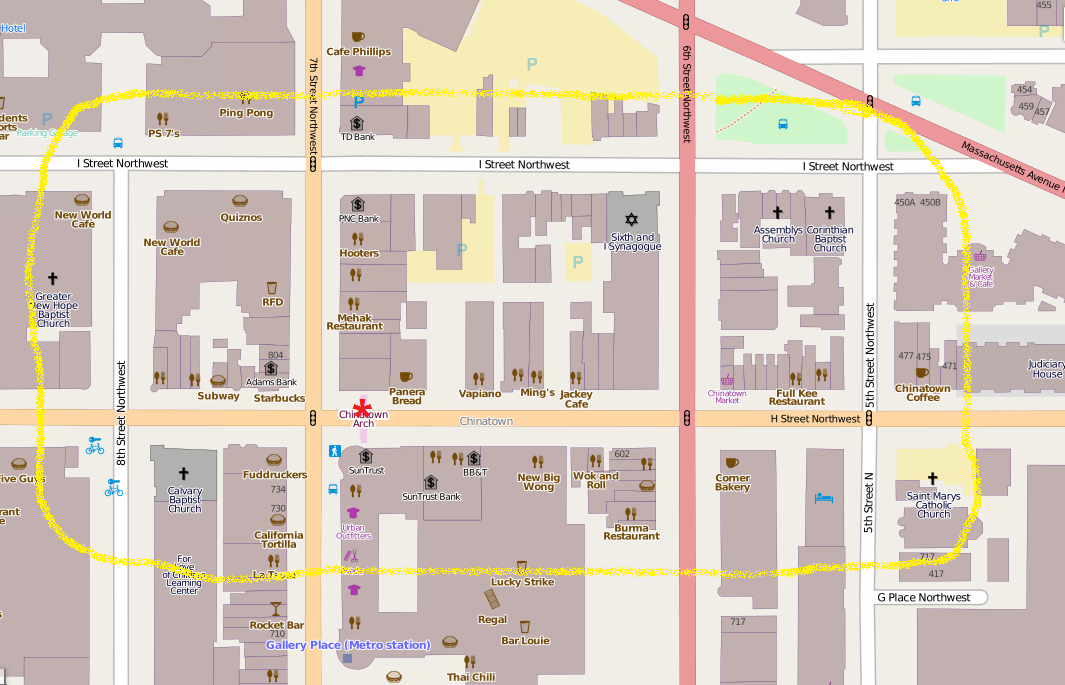
Map of Washington, D.C., with Chinatown highlighted in yellow

Washington, D.C.'s Chinatown is a small, historic area of Downtown Washington, D.C. along H and I Streets between 5th and 8th Streets, Northwest. The area was once home to thousands of Chinese immigrants, but fewer than 300 remained in 2017. The current neighborhood, established around 1931, was the second in Washington to be called “Chinatown.” The first Chinatown began on the south side of Pennsylvania Avenue in the 1880's, but was moved to the H Street area with the development of the Federal Triangle in the early 1930's. In 1986, a Chinese gate designed by Chinese-American architect Alfred H. Liu was built over H Street at 7th Street. By 1997, prominent landmarks such as the Capital One Arena, a sports and entertainment arena, occupied the area. The neighborhood is served by the Gallery Place station of the Washington Metro.

== History ==
The Chinatown area was once home to many Chinese immigrants, who began to move into the area in the 1930s, having been displaced from Washington's original Chinatown along Pennsylvania Avenue by the development of the Federal Triangle government office complex. The newcomers marked it with Chinese signage and decorative metal latticework and railings. At its peak, Chinatown extended from G Street north to Massachusetts Avenue, and from 9th Street east to 5th Street.

Chinatown remained a strong community into the 1960s, but the 1968 Washington, D.C., riots that followed Martin Luther King's assassination, and the ensuing decline of D.C.'s downtown area, led many of the Chinese residents of Chinatown to move to the suburbs of Maryland and Virginia. Throughout the 1970s, Eastern Wind: The Asian-American Community Newsletter of Washington, D.C. published editorials and opinions reacting to the changing neighborhood. An "Open Letter to the Asian Community" advocated for political engagement from the community to preserve Chinatown, and a petition sought to protest the displacement of residents by new plans for development in the area.

In the early 1980s, the D.C. government built a new convention center between 9th and 11th streets, displacing Chinese residents living in the area. In 1982, the city built the Wah Luck House apartments at 6th and H Streets, NW, to accommodate the displaced residents. Designed by architect Alfred Liu, the apartment building introduced modern Chinese design motifs due to the red-paneled balconies.

In 1986, the city dedicated the Friendship Archway, a traditional Chinese gate. This was a collaboration between the Washington DC government and its sister city Beijing. It was intended to attract visitors in addition to recognizing the local Chinese residents. As part of the same effort, the Metro station was given the name Gallery Place-Chinatown until 2011.

The MCI Center was completed in 1997 (renamed Verizon Center in 2006 and Capital One Arena in 2017). After the construction of the arena, AsianWeek said in 2000 that the neighborhood "barely" remains.

Numerous writers have cited Chinatown as an example of gentrification and an example of the commodification of culture. In 2015, the Washington Post reported that only about 300 Chinese-Americans remained in the borough, and many of them were being forced out by their landlords. In 2022 Ruth Tam, et al. stated in a WAMU-FM article that Chinese ethnic activity moved to suburban areas outside of Washington, DC, and shopping for ethnic related goods is no longer done in Washington, DC itself.

=== Annual parade ===
Each year the Chinese Lunar New Year is celebrated with a parade that The Washington Post called, "one of the city’s signature events for more than 50 years". Lunar New Year is a celebration of light with honors family and is said to wipe away bad luck. The annual parade is described as a "massive parade" features dragon dances. The parade was cancelled in 2021 because of the COVID-19 pandemic in the United States.

On February 10, 2019, the parade celebrated the year of the pig. "It featured traditional lion and dragon dances, firecrackers, beauty pageant winners and community groups". The parade route runs along 8th Street NW and in 2020 it featured a person dressed as Caishen and another dressed as a Giant panda. 2020 was the year of the rat and some parade goers had small rat toys.

Another parade which occurs in Chinatown is The Chinese Merchants Association parade. One such parade was hosted on September 10, 1957, William C. Beall was in the Chinatown section of Washington D.C. to photograph a parade. He worked as a staff photographer for The Washington Daily News. Two-year-old Allan Weaver attended the parade and he approached police officer Maurice Cullinane to ask if he was a US Marine. The image was printed in many publications and it also appeared on the back cover of Life (magazine) and it won the 1958 Pulitzer Prize for Photography. Beall named the image Faith and Confidence.

== Demographics ==
Historical population
Census	Pop.	Note	%±
1880	100		—
1930	800		—
2010	300		—
Chinese-American population

In 2010, the census tract that contains Chinatown has around 3,000 residents. Chinatown is only 21% Asian, compared to 1990, when it had a majority Chinese American population. In 1990, its population was 66% Asian and 20% African American. Washington, D.C.'s Chinatown is relatively small in terms of size and number of Chinese residents in comparison to other major Chinatown neighborhoods in the U.S., such as those in San Francisco and in Manhattan. Approximately half of Chinatown's residents live in the Wah Luck House, which has 153 units of apartment complexes. The closest Chinese supermarket, the Great Wall Supermarket, is fourteen miles west in Falls Church, Virginia.

After the deadly 1968 riots following the April assassination of Martin Luther King Jr., many Chinese people sought a more economically stable and safe environment and moved out of Washington, D.C.'s Chinatown, relocating to suburban neighborhoods in Fairfax County, Virginia, and Montgomery County, Maryland. In 1970, there were roughly 3,000 Chinese residents in Washington's Chinatown; by 2016, the number was fewer than 600, many of them seniors residing in two low-income housing developments. North Potomac, Maryland, is 18.4% Chinese American, the highest of any community within the Washington metropolitan area. The Maryland city of Rockville also has a significant population of residents of Chinese descent, at eight percent. In Virginia, sizable Chinese American communities are located in Centreville, Chantilly, and Floris, south of Washington Dulles International Airport.

== Businesses and establishments ==
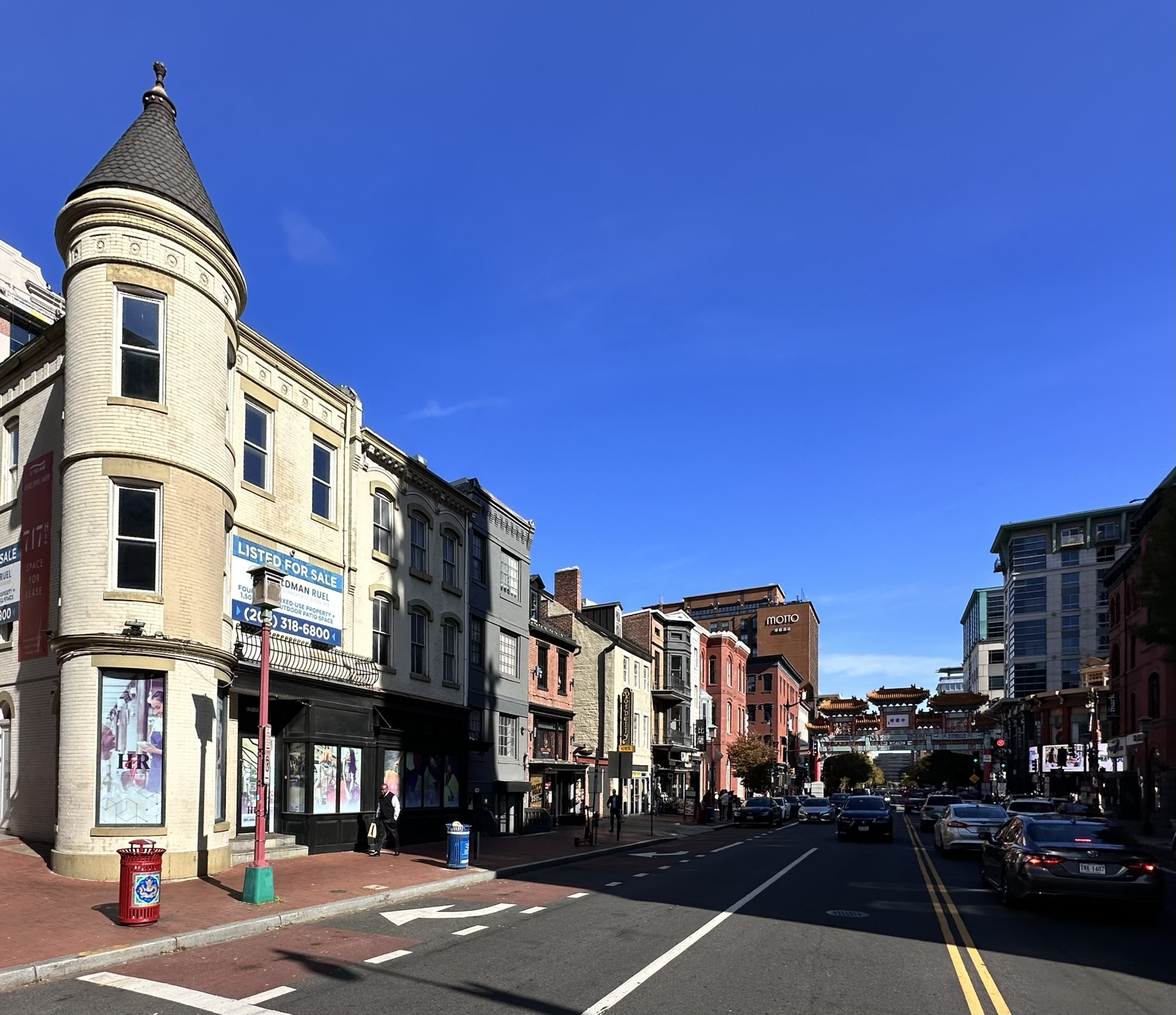
The 700 block of H Street NW in Chinatown. Constructed in the 19th century, the buildings are designated as contributing properties to the Downtown Historic District.

Along with the development of the Verizon Center, historic buildings, mainly along the west side of 7th Street, were renovated and tenanted, primarily with nationally known brand shops and dining establishments. Within a short time, a significant mixed-use office-residential-retail development on the southeast corner of 7th and H streets commenced construction. These developments, which included restaurants, shops, a cinema complex, and a bowling alley, together with the Verizon Center, transformed the area into a bustling scene for nightlife, shopping, and entertainment. An anomaly is that most of the businesses are no longer representative of Chinatown, yet due to city design mandates put in place by the Chinatown Steering Committee in anticipation of urban development, even national chains hang their names in Chinese outside their stores. As a result, D.C.'s Chinatown can be categorized as a semiotic landscape that differs from other Chinatowns. Chinatown has become home to many high-growth technology companies, such as Blackboard, Blue State Digital, LivingSocial, and The Knowland Group. It is also the location of the Washington branch of the Goethe-Institut.

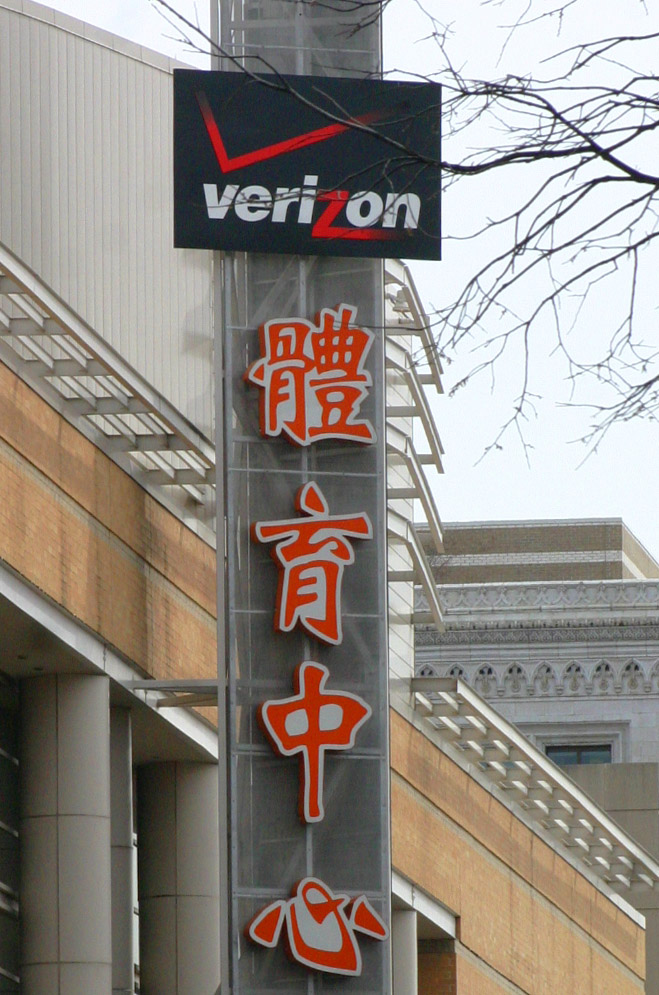
Sign outside the Capital One Arena (then the Verizon Center) in Chinatown (the Chinese sign states: Chinese: 體育中心; pinyin: Tǐyù Zhōngxīn; lit. 'Sports Center')

Chinatown's most prominent businesses are the approximately 20 Chinese and Asian restaurants, almost all of which are owned by Asian American families. Among the most well-known are Chinatown Express, Eat First, Full Kee, and Tony Cheng's. One of the restaurants, Wok & Roll, occupies what was once the Mary E. Surratt Boarding House — the meeting place for John Wilkes Booth and his conspirators in Abraham Lincoln's assassination. Another is located in a house once owned by the On Leong Chinese Merchants Association, which was among the first Chinese organizations to move into the neighborhood; today the structure is on the National Register of Historic Places.

The neighborhood is home to a Chinese video store, several general stores, and numerous Chinese American cultural and religious charities. Chinatown has one Chinese church, Chinese Community Church, located at 500 I Street. Chinese Community Church was founded in 1935, initially at L Street, but relocated in 2006 to its current I Street location. The Sixth & I Historic Synagogue has been restored and is the scene of cultural events.

The Washington DC Chinatown Community Cultural Center offers numerous activities, classes and services.

== Housing ==
As of 2019 the housing stock includes rowhouses, condominium complexes, and a few townhouses. Much of the housing is for rental use.

As of 2011 the Wah Luck House (traditional Chinese: 華樂大廈; simplified Chinese: 华乐大厦; Jyutping: waa4 lok6 daai6 haa6; pinyin: Huá Lè Dàshà) has many of the remaining ethnic Chinese residents, and this continued in 2018. The complex opened in 1982. In a period until 2018, the ownership of the complex had changed. The designer of the complex was Alfred H. Liu, who immigrated to the United States from Taiwan.

== Transportation ==
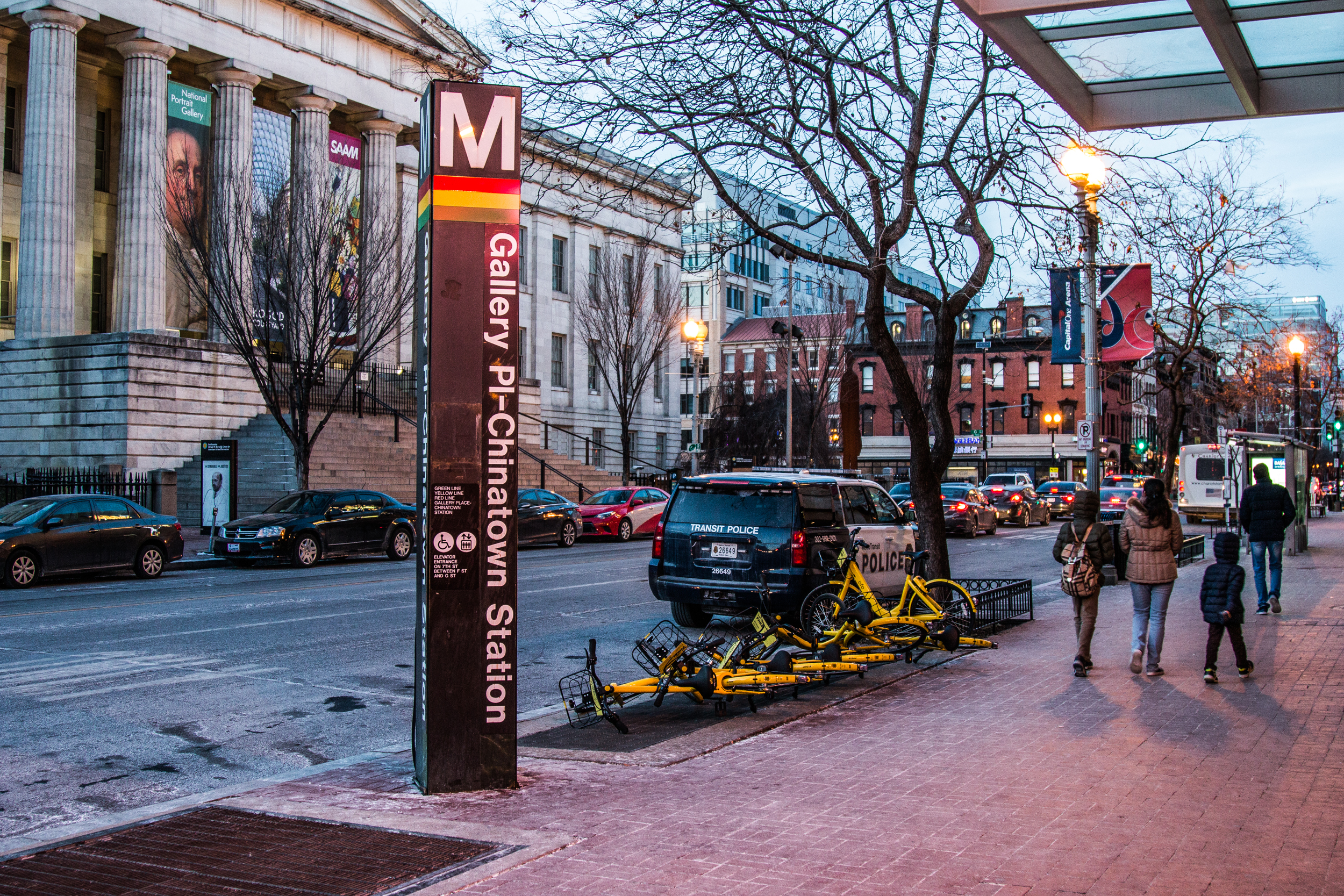
Pylon for the Gallery Place–Chinatown Washington Metro station

The Gallery Place—Chinatown Washington Metro station (on the Red, Green, and Yellow Lines), which opened in 1976, serves the neighborhood. The name of the station was changed to Gallery Place-Chinatown in 1986. Two important Metrobus routes cross at 7th and H Streets.

As of 2011, on a once monthly basis, a shuttle to a suburban shopping center allows the residents of Wah Luck House to shop for ethnic groceries.

== Cityscape ==
The law of the District of Columbia requires businesses in the Chinatown zone to have some form of name in Chinese characters, in either the Traditional Chinese or Simplified Chinese scripts.

The chairperson of the Chinatown Development Corporation, Alfred Liu, designed the Friendship Archway, the community's paifang, which was commissioned by the District of Columbia Government. Construction of the paifang began in June 1986. The idea came when Marion Barry visited China in May 1984 and conversed with the Mayor of Beijing, Chen Xitong. There was criticism from Lawrence Locke, the head of the Chinese Consolidated Benevolent Association (CCBA), and other Chinatown residents who were aligned with the Republic of China on Taiwan, and who disagreed with influence from the People's Republic of China. The CCBA had plans to create a different paifang, through it never materialized and the CCBA announced in 1988 that it nixed the idea.

== Education ==
Residents are zoned to District of Columbia Public Schools. As of 2019 zoned schools are Walker-Jones Education Campus (a K-8 school) and Dunbar High School.

== In culture ==
Within the FBI-commissioned film Game of Pawns the D.C. Chinatown is used as a stand-in for Shanghai.

== See also ==
- Chinatown, Baltimore
- Rockville, Maryland
- Taiwanese Americans
- Chinese Americans
