= 1958 Pulitzer Prize =

Awards for journalism and related fields

The following are the Pulitzer Prizes for 1958.

== Journalism awards ==
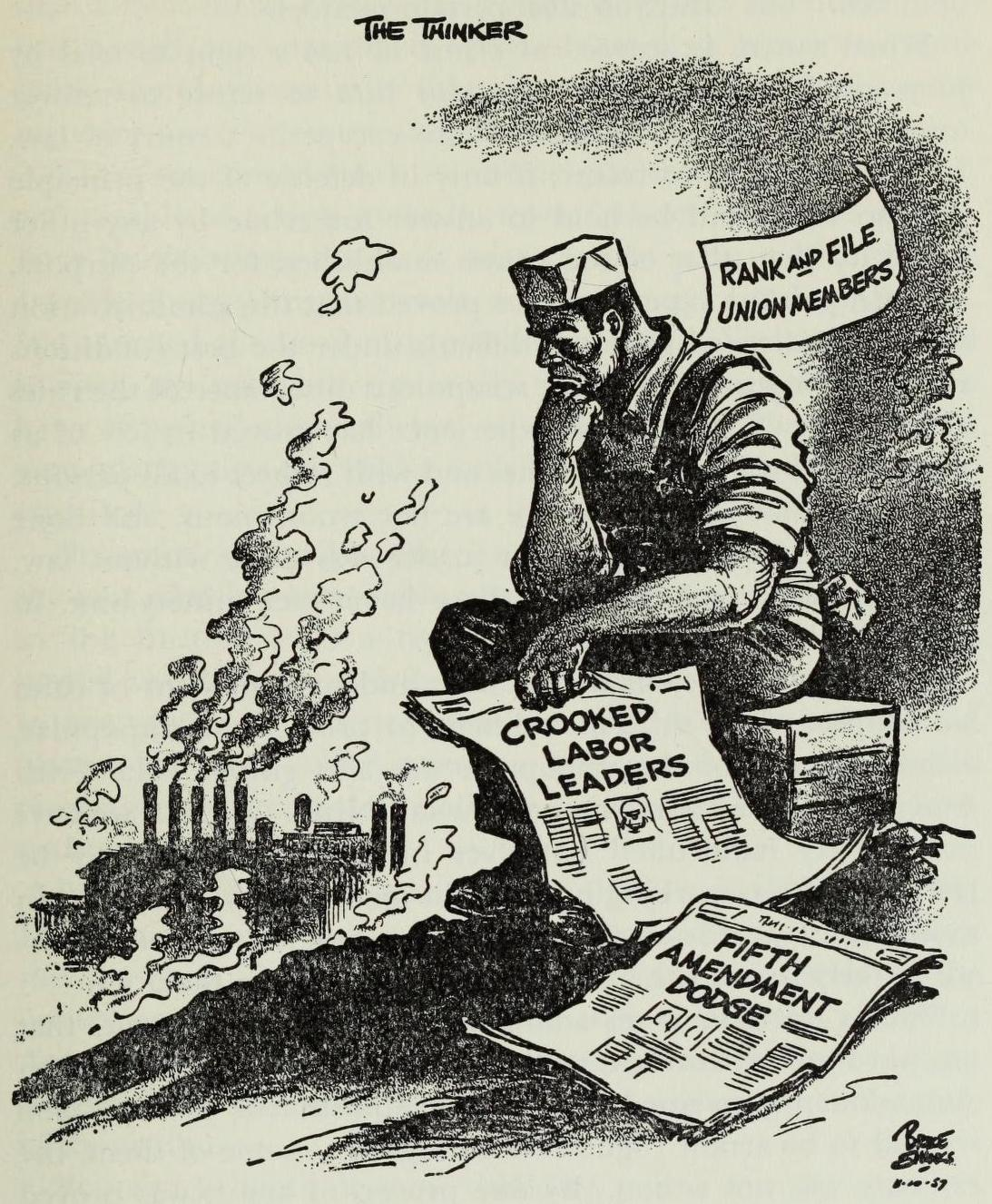
"The Thinker", the prize-winning editorial cartoon

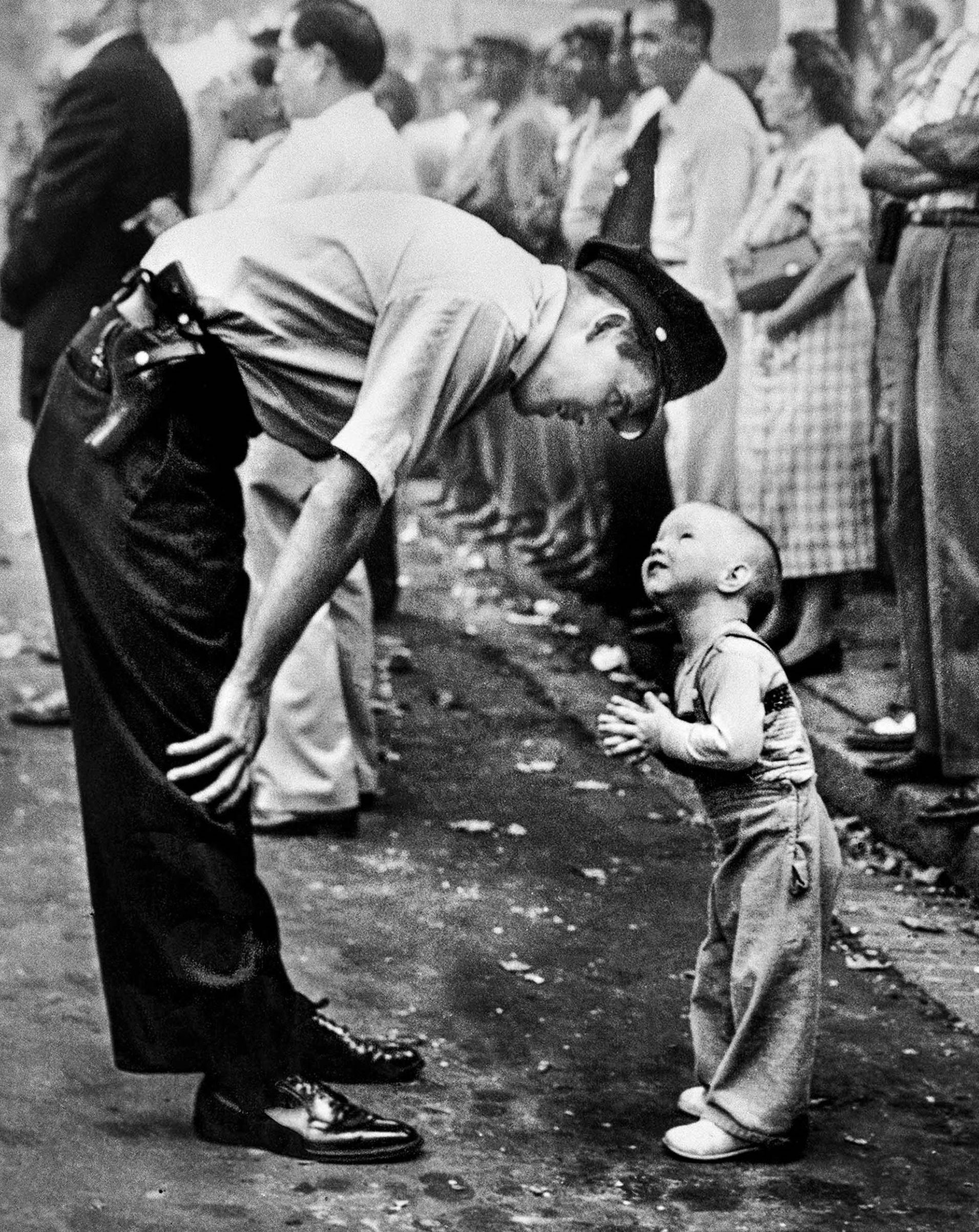
Faith and Confidence, the prize-winning photograph

- Public Service:
  - The Arkansas Gazette, for demonstrating the highest qualities of civic leadership, journalistic responsibility and moral courage in the face of great public tension during the school integration crisis of 1957. The newspaper's fearless and completely objective news coverage, plus its reasoned and moderate policy, did much to restore calmness and order to an overwrought community, reflecting great credit on its editors and its management.
- Local Reporting, Edition Time:
  - The Fargo Forum, for its swift, vivid and detailed news and picture coverage of a tornado which struck Fargo on June 20. Proceeding under considerable difficulty and overcoming many handicaps, a small but skilled staff put out a complete tornado edition within five hours after the disaster.
- Local Reporting, No Edition Time:
  - George D. Beveridge of the Washington Evening Star, for his excellent and thought-provoking series, "Metro, City of Tomorrow", describing in depth the urban problems of Washington, D.C., which stimulated widespread public consideration of these problems and encouraged further studies by both public and private agencies.
- National Reporting:
  - Clark Mollenhoff of the Des Moines Register and Tribune, for his persistent inquiry into labor racketeering, which included investigatory reporting of wide significance.
  - Relman Morin of the Associated Press, for his dramatic and incisive eyewitness report of mob violence on September 23, 1957, during the integration crisis at the Central High School in Little Rock, Arkansas.
- International Reporting:
  - The New York Times, for its distinguished coverage of foreign news, which was characterized by admirable initiative, continuity and high quality during the year.
- Editorial Writing:
  - Harry S. Ashmore, executive editor of the Arkansas Gazette, for the forcefulness, dispassionate analysis and clarity of his editorials on the school integration conflict in Little Rock.
- Editorial Cartooning:
  - Bruce Shanks of the Buffalo Evening News, for "The Thinker", published on August 10, 1957, depicting the dilemma of union membership when confronted by racketeering leaders in some labor unions
- Photography:
  - William C. Beall of The Washington Daily News, for his photograph Faith and Confidence, showing policeman Maurice Cullinane patiently reasoning with a two-year-old boy trying to cross a street during a parade.
- Special Citation:
  - Walter Lippmann, nationally syndicated columnist of the New York Herald Tribune, for the wisdom, perception and high sense of responsibility with which he has commented for many years on national and international affairs.

== Letters, Drama and Music Awards ==
- Fiction:
  - A Death in the Family by James Agee (a posthumous publication) (McDowell, Obolensky).
- Drama:
  - Look Homeward, Angel by Ketti Frings (Samuel French).
- History:
  - Banks and Politics in America by Bray Hammond (Princeton Univ. Press).
- Biography or Autobiography:
  - George Washington, Volumes I-VI by Douglas S. Freeman, and Volume VII, written by John Alexander Carroll and Mary Wells Ashworth after Freeman's death in 1953 (Charles Scribner's Sons).
- Poetry:
  - Promises: Poems 1954-1956 by Robert Penn Warren (Random).
- Music:
  - Vanessa by Samuel Barber (G. Schirmer), an opera in four acts, libretto by Gian-Carlo Menotti. First presented January 15, 1958, at the Metropolitan Opera House.
