= Chinatown, Baltimore =

Chinatown
- Neighborhood of Baltimore
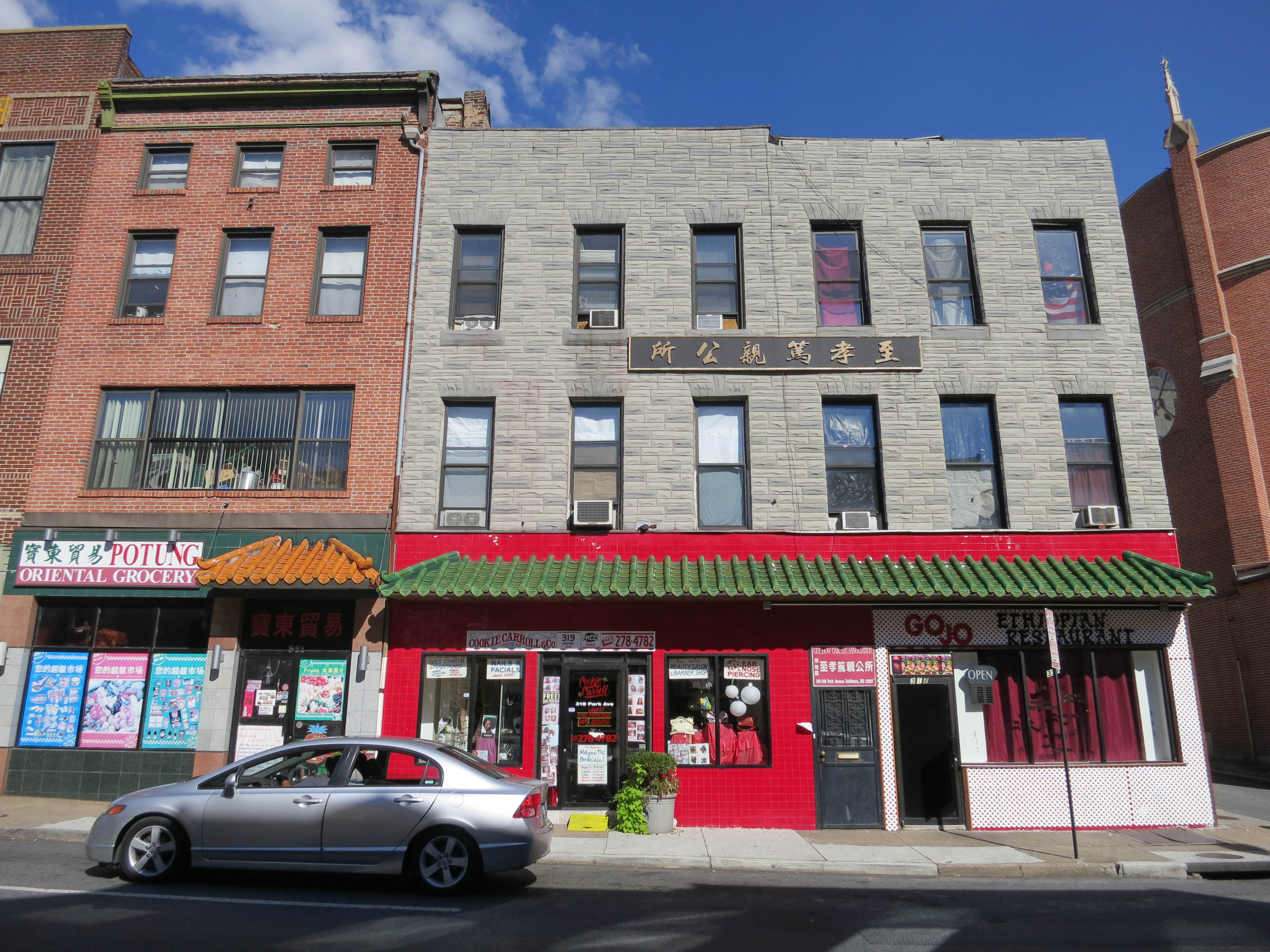
- Park Avenue Chinese stores

- Location within Baltimore
- Coordinates: 39°17.628′N 76°37.0944′W
- Country: United States
- State: Maryland
- City: Baltimore
- ZIP Code: 21201
- Area code: Area code 410
- Chinatown Historic District
- U.S. National Register of Historic Places
- U.S. Historic district
- NRHP reference No.: 100009990
- Added to NRHP: March 4, 2024

The U.S. city of Baltimore, Maryland (Chinese: 巴爾的摩; pinyin: bā ěr dì mó) is home to a small Chinatown. Historically, Baltimore had at least two districts that were called "Chinatown" where the first one existed on the 200 block of Marion Street during the 1880s. A second and current location is at the 300 block of Park Ave., which was dominated by laundries and restaurants. The initial Chinese population came because of the transcontinental railroad, however, the Chinese population never exceeded 400 as of 1941. During segregation, Chinese children were classified as "white" and went to the white schools. Chinatown was largely gone by the First World War due to urban renewal. Although Chinatown was largely spared from the riots of the 1960s, most of the Chinese residents moved to the suburbs. As of 2009, the area still shows signs of blight and does not have a Chinese arch. As of 2017, the area has become an “immigration hub” for Ethiopian people. In 2018, a mural of a Chinese dragon and an African lion was painted to signify the past as a Chinatown and the present as an African neighborhood. A night market in September 2018 marked the first Asian celebration of the area, which was “long forgotten and neglected”.

== Demographics ==
According to the 2000 U.S. census, Baltimore's Chinese population stands at 2,404 or about 0.37% of the total population of 651,154. The Asian population is 9,985 also by the same census figures.

== History ==
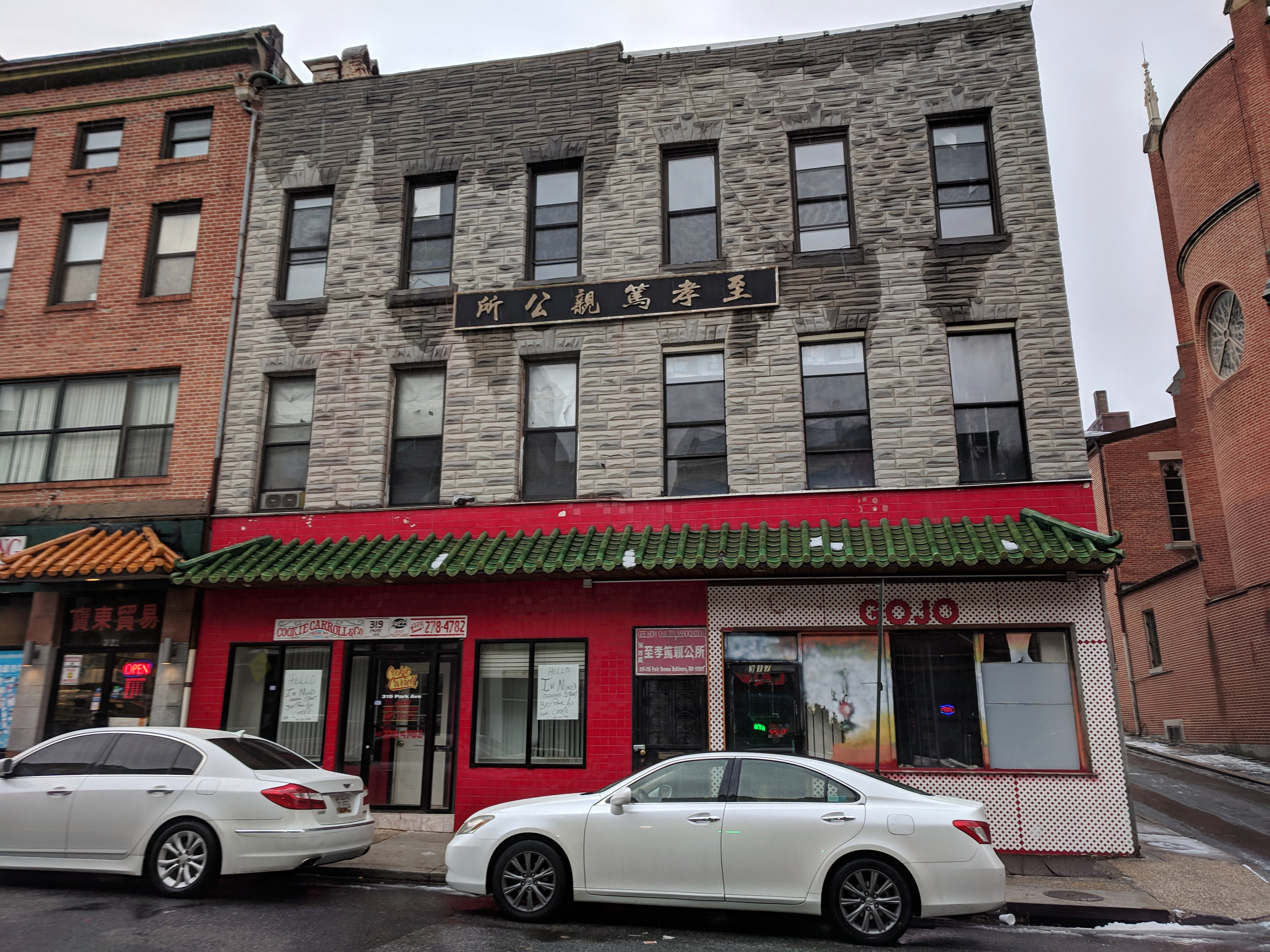
Baltimore's Chinatown, February 2019.

Baltimore's first Chinese residents may have arrived as early as the 1870s, but have confirmed records dating to the 1880s. According to the Baltimore Chinatown project, "... the first Chinatown in Baltimore was located on the 200 block of Marion Street and was surrounded by Fayette Street on the south; Park Avenue on the east; Howard Street on the west; and Lexington Street on the north." After World War I, the Chinatown moved "... two blocks north on Park Avenue and Mulberry Street because of city renewal."

Although Baltimore was generally less discriminatory against the Chinese, as compared with the South and other cities, Chinese men and women generally had trouble finding jobs outside of the government sector and was largely confined to the family owned laundromats and restaurants. This status forced many to also have some limited social interactions with the black community that the race riots of the 1960s largely spared Chinese owned businesses which were generally in Chinatown. However, the decline of Chinatown still occurred as many if not most of the Chinese residents moved to the suburbs. Most have left for Washington D.C. and Rockville, Maryland.

For the years of 1950 to 1970, Shang Wah Long Company was located at 304-306 Park Avenue, a Chinese Grocery/Gift Shop. It was relocated from Mulberry Street (US Route 40 East). It grew to a larger size. The White Rice Inn was located at 320 Park Avenue, a Chinese Restaurant. Within the 300 block Park Avenue were other shops and several Chinese Family "surname" Associations were present. Expansion of Chinese influence was through additional Chinese Restaurants about town by names of The Rice Inn (Sandtown Winchester), The Ho Joy Restaurant (Middle River), The Rice Bowl (Glen Burnie), and Golden Star (Waverly). The cooking style/cuisine was "Cantonese."

During the life span of the "Baltimore Chinatown" Chinese Lunar New Year was celebrated. Refer, to definition of Chinese zodiac. A Chinese Dragon Dance, fire cracker, dancing, passing out "Lucky Red Envelopes." Chinese movies were shown in Chinatown at the On Leong Association. Chinese language schools, at different times, were located in On Leong Association and Grace and Saint Peter's Episcopal Church.

As early as the 1970s, Baltimore's Chinatown was in a state of decline to the point that the neighborhood was losing its Chinese characteristics. While many efforts were drawn up since then to revitalize the neighborhood, Park Avenue Chinatown practically ceased to exist with only one Chinese restaurant surviving, "The Chinatown Café". As of 2008, there were debates about whether Baltimore should revitalize the old Chinatown in the location of Park Avenue or build a new one about a mile north at Charles Street and North Avenue.

As of 2009, the Chinatown Café was replaced by another Chinese restaurant called "Zhongshan."

== Origins ==
Chinese settlers migrated to Baltimore for many reasons, including migration from the West Coast to the East Coast, spurred by the completion of the Transcontinental railroad. The eastward migration of Chinese included destinations such as New York, Philadelphia and Boston, where the Chinese laborers comprised almost 80 percent of the construction workforce as they completed their work in the West by around 1869. Many of these laborers ventured eastward in search of jobs.

Another cause for the eastward migration was the anti-Chinese sentiment that was generally felt in the West Coast Chinatowns, such as San Francisco, which was fueled by the economic downturn of the late 1860s. The laws and the courts generally gave little protection to the minority group and many fled eastward to escape the anti-Chinese riots, and the "... humiliation and persecution." At the time, Baltimore, being a coastal city and was at one time "... the nation's second largest port of entry" that welcomed European immigrants offered a place where people "... did not live in fear." Most early Asian settlers "... did not come to Baltimore by way of ship, but instead arrived from the West Coast by rail, Baltimore’s reputation as a relatively welcome place for the arrival of international visitors did encourage thousands of Chinese immigrants to locate in the city."

== See also ==
- Chinatown, Rockville
- Chinatown (Washington, D.C.)
- Lum v. Rice
