= Maurice Cullinane =

Police chief of Washington D.C. 1954–1978

- Maurice Cullinane
- Born: Maurice J. Cullinane; November 29, 1932; Washington, D.C., U.S.
- Died: March 2, 2023 (aged 90); Bethesda, Maryland, U.S.
- Other names: Cully
- Occupation: Police chief
- Years active: 1954–1978
- Known for: Faith and Confidence

Maurice J. Cullinane (November 29, 1932 – March 2, 2023) was the chief of police in Washington, D.C., from December 1974 to January 1978. He was captured in a 1958 Pulitzer Prize–winning photograph titled Faith and Confidence.

== Early life ==
On November 29, 1932, Cullinane was born in Washington, D.C. In 1950 he graduated from Calvin Coolidge High School. After graduating high school, in 1951 he joined the United States Navy and served until 1953.

== Career ==
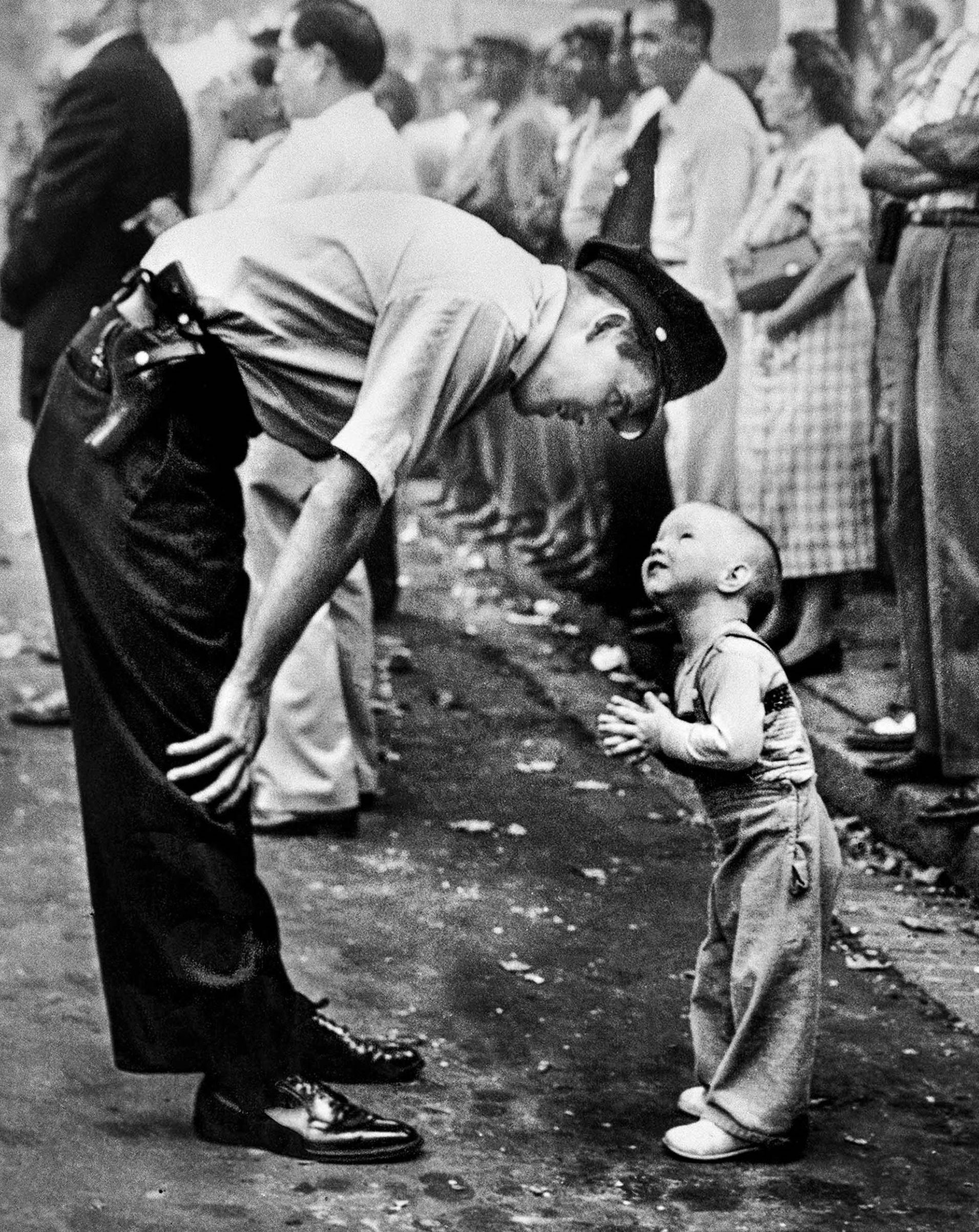
(1957) Faith and Confidence, Police officer Maurice Cullinane patiently reasons with a two-year-old boy

In 1954 Cullinane became a police officer in the Washington Metropolitan Police Department. His nickname was "Cully". In 1957 while working a parade in Chinatown, Washington, D.C., Cullinane was captured in a photograph which showed him speaking to a small child who was in the street. The photograph by William C. Beall of The Washington Daily News newspaper won a Pulitzer Prize in 1958.

Cullinane was a police lieutenant during the 1968 Washington, D.C., riots. During the riots there was significant property damage and 13 deaths. Only two fatalities were attributed to Washington, D.C., police officer actions. In 2018 Cullinane said,

For that I was proud of my department. They were not going to kill somebody to save a window from getting broken or to save a liquor store.

In 1973 Cullinane was promoted to the rank of Assistant Chief of Police, and he became the Chief of Police in 1974. In 1977 he negotiated an end to a crisis where Hanafi Muslims held more than 100 people hostage.

Cullinane's retirement as a police officer in 1978 was for a job-related disability. While working a demonstration against the Vietnam War in 1968 he had an injury to his knee and he was eligible to retire and collect US$31,000 a year for the remainder of his life.

After his 1978 retirement from the police department, Cullinane became the Chairman of the Committee to promote Washington. He earned his bachelor's degree from American University in 1977 while he was still the chief of police.

== Personal life ==
Cullinane married Carole West in 1956 and they had three daughters: Patricia, Debra, and Joanne. Their daughter Patricia Carr said her father died from complications after a stroke. He had been at a Bethesda, Maryland hospital and died March 2, 2023.
