= William C. Beall =

American photographer

- Born: February 6, 1911; Washington, D.C., U.S.
- Died: March 27, 1994 (aged 83)
- Occupation: Photographer
- Known for: Faith and Confidence

William C. Beall (February 6, 1911 – March 27, 1994) was an American Pulitzer-winning photographer. In 1957 he captured a photograph of two-year-old Allan Weaver and police officer Maurice Cullinane which he titled Faith and Confidence. The image won the 1958 Pulitzer Prize for Photography.

Beall worked as the chief photographer for The Washington Daily News. He also served in the military as a US Marine combat photographer in the Pacific Theatre of World War II. He covered the Battle of Iwo Jima and the Battle of Okinawa.

== Early life ==
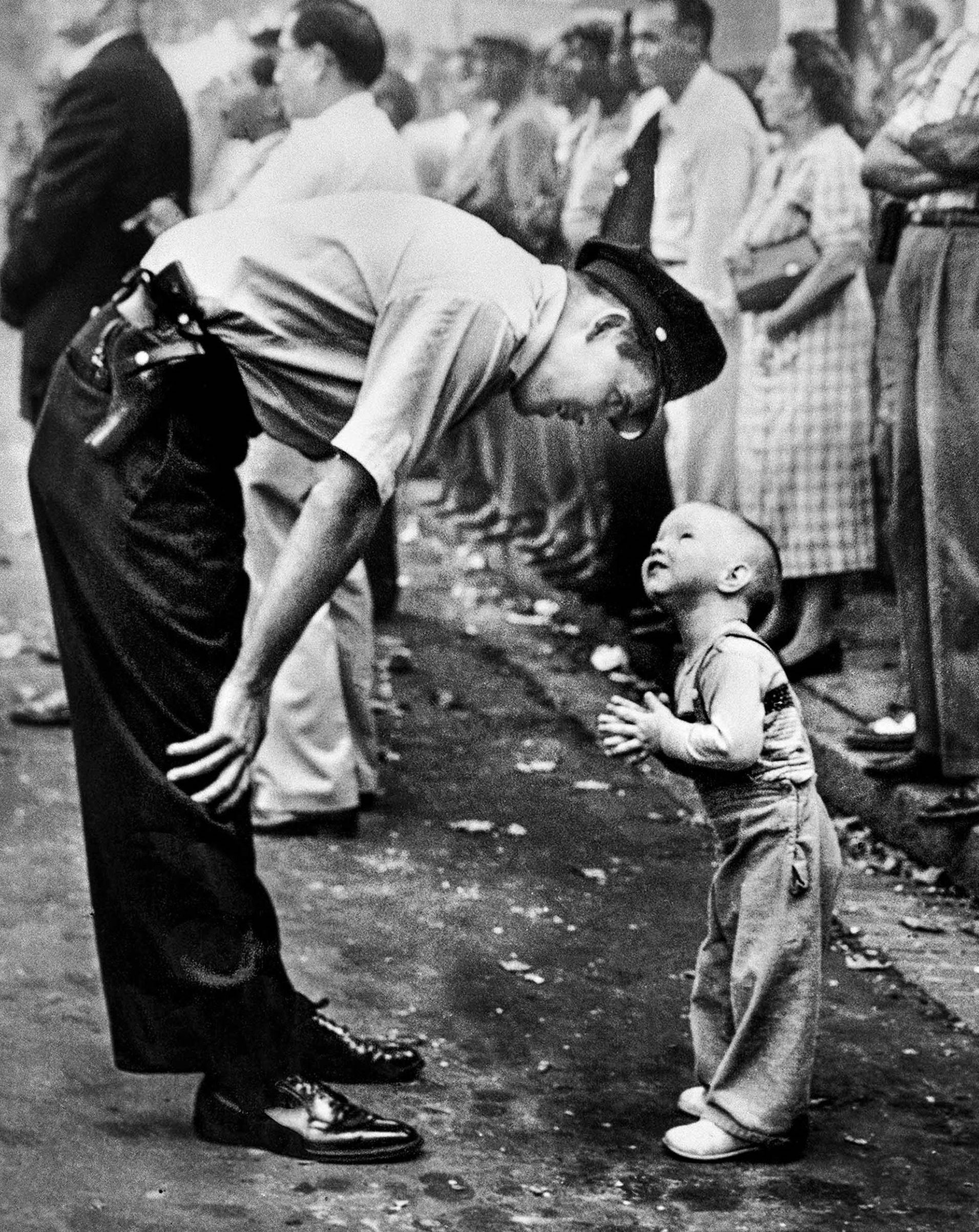
(1957) Beall's Pulitzer Prize-winning photograph Faith and Confidence, a policeman patiently reasons with a two-year-old boy

On February 6, 1911, William Charles Beall was born in Washington, D.C. He attended public schools in Washington, D.C., and in 1927, when he was sixteen years old he started working as a photographer for a photo agency.

== Career ==
In 1933 Beall began working for the Washington Post and in 1935 he began working for The Washington Daily News. In 1940 he was promoted to chief photographer at The Washington Daily News. Beall, became a Marine combat photographer during World War II. He spent time in the Pacific Theatre on the island of Iwo Jima. He also covered the 1945 Battle of Okinawa and he was awarded the Air Medal for his coverage.

On September 10, 1957, Beall was in Chinatown to photograph a parade. Two-year-old Allan Weaver attended the parade and he approached police officer Maurice Cullinane to ask if he was a US Marine. Beall captured the moment and titled the image Faith and Confidence. As well as appearing in The Washington Daily News, it was printed on the back cover of Life magazine. The image won the 1958 Pulitzer Prize for Photography.

Beall also received awards from the National Headliners Club, the United Press International News Pictures Contest, and the National Press Photographers Association.
