= Alfred H. Liu =

Taiwanese American architect (1942–2021)

Alfred H. Liu (1942–2021) was a Chinese-American architect best known for his designed buildings in Washington, DC's Chinatown including its iconic paifang, the Friendship Archway. However, he contributed much to preserving DC Chinatown against ongoing gentrification with the Wah Luck House, the Chinatown Design Guidelines Study, and acting in many other leading roles for Chinatown's economic development.

== Early life and education ==
In 1942, Alfred H. Liu was born in Chongqing, China, but would be raised in Taiwan. As a boy Liu demonstrated great artistic talent in Chinese ink painting. To cultivate these talents his parents sent him to train under renowned artist and poet, Pu Xinyu. By the age of fourteen, one of Liu's paintings was chosen by the Taiwanese Ministry of Education to be sent as a gift to the Global Teachers' Association in Washington, DC. At seventeen Liu held a personal exhibition at the Taiwan Chungshan Hall with great success. Liu's exhibition earned Soong Mei Ling's praise (Madam Chiang Kai Shek) and all 200 paintings sold out - Liu was established as a young artist in Taiwan.

In 1961 using the money from selling his paintings, Liu immigrated to the United States. He originally came to attend Notre Dame, but was refused admission by the administration. They referred Liu to Aquinas College. His college career began with multiple struggles: Liu was often ridiculed because his English wasn't fluent, the language barrier caused isolation, and with little money, he washed dishes in the cafeteria to support himself in America. Liu was afraid of being kicked out, being sent back to Taiwan with no plan or money besides mandatory military service. Despite these hardships, Liu's self-respect fueled his work ethic. He learned English while washing dishes and presented pictures of his personal exhibition in Taiwan and his high school records to appeal to the board of admission. Unknown to him, Liu's work made it onto the local newspaper, The Grand Rapids Press. The newspaper praised his work and announced Liu as a student bringing Chinese art to America and Aquinas College. Liu was displeased by the newspaper's implicit advertising of the school - it misrepresented his reasons for being at the school, holding zero recognition for the struggles he faced. Still, Liu continued with his studies. Tutoring his peers in math and physics, Liu earned their respect and would be voted as a student senate officer in his senior year. In 1965 Alfred Liu graduated with a B.A. in Physics and Mathematics from Aquinas College. Reflecting on this time, Liu considered Aquinas as formative to his success in America.

He continued his education with an M.A. in Physics from Columbia University in 1967, and a Bachelor of Architecture (B.Arch) from Columbia University in 1971.

== Career ==
Alfred Liu has been in professional practice since 1966. He was certified by the National Council of Architectural Registration Board and as member of the American Institute of Architects (1975) he was registered to practice architecture across twelve U.S. states. In 1976 Liu would establish his own firm, AEPA Architects Engineers, P.C.AEPA supports projects in biomedical research, environmental facilities design, commercial and residential buildings, interior design, among other services. In 2008 it was reported to have a 60-member staff with 21 branches in China. This international aspect has fueled many U.S.- China relations. Liu's company is responsible for domestic projects such as the Wah-Luck House, the Friendship Arch, New York City's Lower Manhattan Waterfront Development, National Institute of Health FDA Building 29B, and the Social Security Administration headquarters in Baltimore, Maryland. Overseas, his company has worked on the Beijing Summer Olympics water sports system, Haikou Convention Center, Haikou Plaza, Mi Du Plaza, Tianfu International Plaza, Yiling Biotech Research and Production Center, and Taiwan Cultural, Religious Ecological Park.

=== Politics ===
Liu has had a brief but significant role, participating across many levels of politics. During college, Liu was a part of a republican assembly. Being Asian with connections to China and Taiwan in a predominantly white community, the Aquinas students believed that by accepting him into this assembly they would teach him about democracy. Although Liu disagreed with the student's assumption of the U.S. being the exemplar of democracy, he joined the assembly, becoming the main speaker.

In 1991, he would succeed Anna Chan Chenault as the chairman of the Republican Asian Assembly. In 1992 Liu was nominated by then President Bush as Chairman of the National Institute of Building Sciences. On the national level, he participated in U.S. congress discussion about a trade embargo on China, challenging the dominant narrative on U.S.'s idea of democracy and interventionist policy.

Outside of congress and elections, Liu had a part in fostering the U.S.-China relations in DC. Liu was served in DC Mayor Marion Barry's Official Trade Delegation to China (1984). Moreover, Liu acted in many organizations such as co-founder of Mayor Barry's District of Columbia Downtown Partnership, general member of the National Endowment for the Arts (NEA) (1974-1976), President of the Chinatown Development Corporation (1984-1996), and as member Chinatown Steering Committee (1983-2021).

== Contributions to DC Chinatown ==
Washington DC's Chinatown has gone through waves of displacement, redevelopment, and ongoing gentrification. DC Chinatown struggled in part because there wasn't an established home rule until 1973. This had allowed the federal government to overrule DC. The original DC Chinatown was forcibly disbanded in 1931, when the land was seized for the Federal Triangle and other municipal projects. A new Chinatown would be established on H street NW between 5th and 7th. However, many townhouses were burned down during the 1968 riots. The riots would cause another wave of people to leave Chinatown. At the time Liu was volunteering for New York City's Chinatown. In 1971, after hearing about the struggles of the small DC Chinatown, Liu went to DC to help. Thomas Gray, public works committee chairman, had planned to develop a community center and sports center. Liu had gathered support of the local Chinatown business and restaurant owners to discuss the development. The sports center lacked funding for construction. The delay allowed Liu to gather support and protest the sports center as well as other federal buildings' repeated displacement of Chinatown. In 1972 Liu received grants for a Chinatown study. After conducting the Chinatown Design Guidelines Study, Liu concerned himself with major projects to revitalize Chinatown like resolving land disputes over the community center (Wah-Luck House). By 1981 Chinatown was considered to be on the verge of extinction. Successful Chinese Americans had left to suburbs and counties such as Fairfax Virginia and Montgomery County Maryland. Still, Liu's efforts remain. The Wah-Luck House and Friendship Arch are one of the last, persevering pieces of Chinatown.

Wah Luck House

=== Wah Luck House ===
Liu designed the Wah-Luck House in 1982 for low-income residents, especially the older residents of Chinatown who had already retired. The apartment complex house is made of brick and concrete. Standing at ten stories, the complex houses 153 units and is located on the corner of 6th and H streets NW. It is one of the oldest, most affordable housing complexes in Chinatown. The value of the land beneath Wah Luck House remains an anxious topic for its residents. During the 1970s the Chinese Consolidated Benevolent Association (CCBA) sent an application to the U.S. Department of Housing and Urban Development to own the land beneath Wah Luck House. The CCBA only received ownership of half an acre. The House is a unique case in real estate because of this ground lease. In August 2017, the real estate company Aimco (Apartment Investment and Management Company) sold Wah Luck House to Wah Luck House Preservation LLC (WHLP) for $55 million dollars. Yeni Wong manages WHLP while also acting as owner of Chinatown Garden and Joy Luck House. The sale carries three important features: the senior and Chinese (and Chinese-American) residents get to stay in the building; tenants continue to pay affordable rent through the Section 8 housing voucher program; and the building would undergo a $9 million renovation.

=== Friendship Arch ===
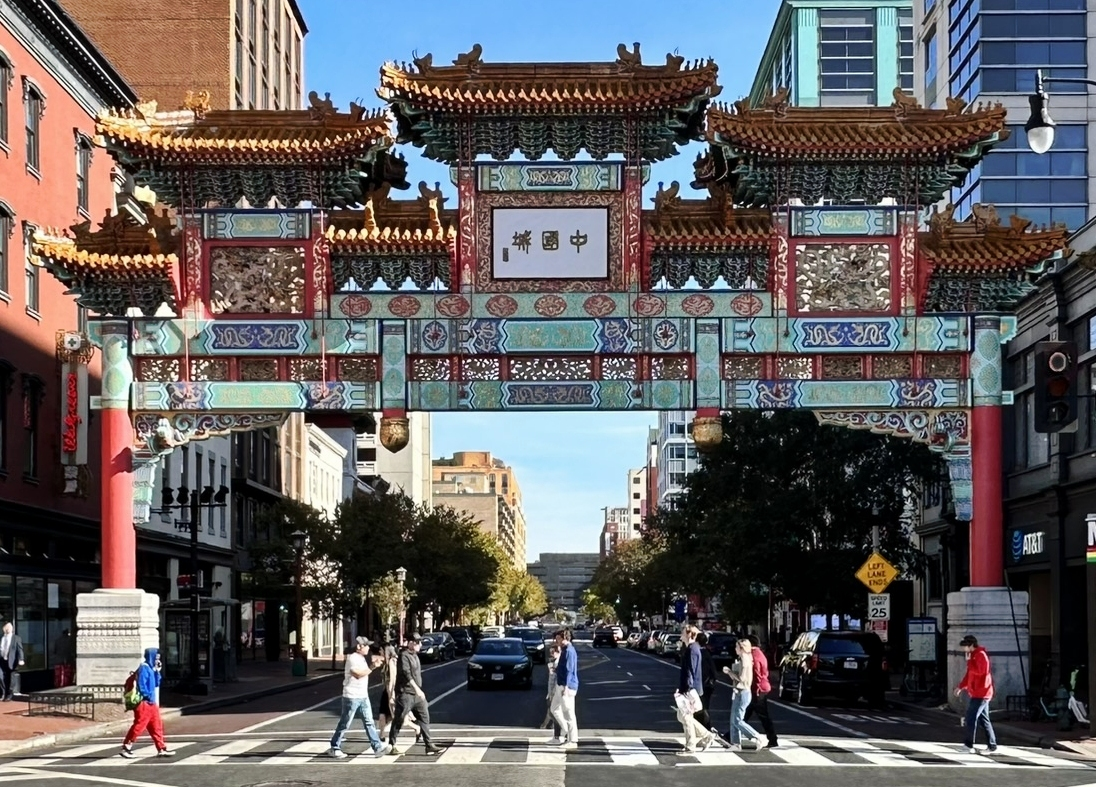
DC Chinatown Friendship Arch

Liu and Dr. Dwan L. Tai, by then two of Chinatown's leaders, wrote a paper titled "The Future of Washington's Chinatown: Extinction or Distinction", arguing for a visible attraction to bring in visitors. In 1985 after an exchange of visits, Mayor Marion Barry and Mayor Chen Xitong, the Mayor of Beijing, signed a sister-city agreement proposing a Friendship Arch. The arch, spanning H Street NW at Seventh Street, would cost $1 million dollars to construct. The District government and the People's Republic of China (ROC) equally covered the costs. Liu was the primary architect for the arch. He designed the arch after royal architecture from the Ming and Qing dynasties. The arch stands at 47 feet tall from ground to the top of its highest roof, weighing over 128 tons. The roof makes up nearly a third of the weight at 63 tons, supported by 27 tons of steel and 38 tons of concrete. The arch has over 7,000 glazed tiles and 35,000 gildedwooden pieces, accented by 12 carved ceramic dragons and 272 painted dragons and other mystical creatures. Sixteen artists from China constructed the arch. These artists gilded the tiles with gold leaf, applying bold colors to the arch using a combination of natural materials. When designing the arch, Liu noted the use of gold as historically reserved for the emperor. Such use of gold denotes the importance of the project, a marker of wealth and honor. The design also contains superstitious importance: the dragons were believed to keep the roof from falling.

The Arch was officially open to the public on November 20th, 1986. Mayor Barry and the Mayor of Beijing would have their names chiseled into the marble base of the south support. Despite their labor and contributions, Liu and the 16 artists from China would have their names sealed in a box placed high in the center roof - the placement invisible from any eyes, even from an aerial viewpoint.
