= Friendship Archway =

Archway in Washington, D.C., United States

- The gate, facing east from 7th and H into Chinatown; photographed by Carol Highsmith c.1986
- Interactive map of Friendship Archway
- Location: 675 H St NW
- Coordinates: 38.89982°N 77.021692°W
- Designer: Alfred H. Liu
- Opening date: November 20, 1986
- Restored date: 1993, 2009, 2019

Friendship Archway is a paifang installed at Chinatown, Washington, D.C., United States. It is one of the largest ceremonial arches outside of China.

== History ==
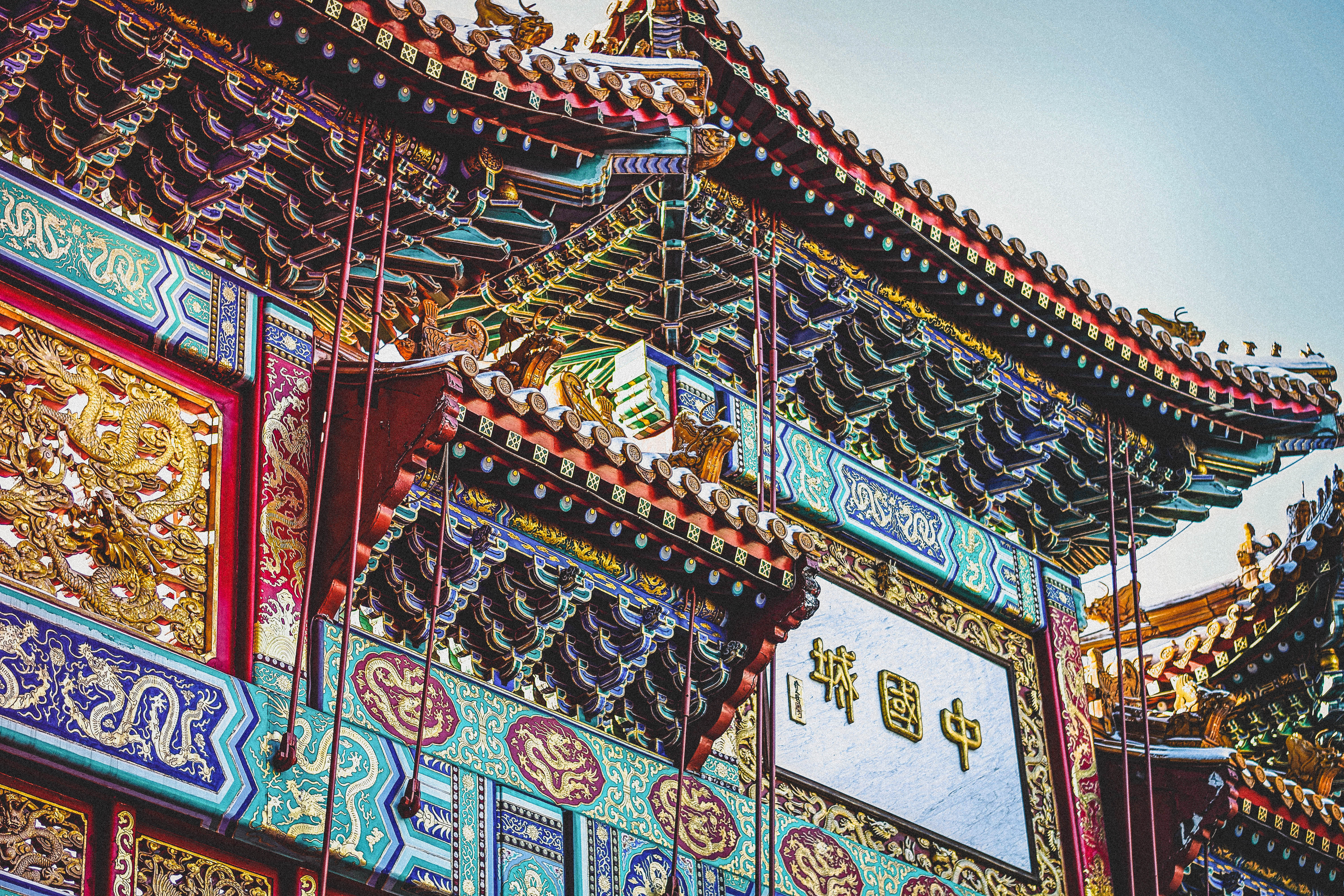
Detail, 2016

Planning for an archway began in 1984, to be jointly funded by Washington DC's newly-announced sister city, Beijing. However, the largely anti-communist population of Chinatown, where the archway was to be located, disagreed with the involvement of mainland China and protested.

Local architect Alfred H. Liu designed the Friendship Archway in 1985 after city officials rejected plans for twelve smaller arches to be placed throughout Chinatown, each decorated with one of the Chinese zodiac animals. Liu had previously designed Wah Luck House, a low-income residential high-rise, in 1982 to meet a HUD deadline; that building was designed in three days and constructed in seven weeks. He was also chairman of the Chinatown Development Corporation, and had emigrated from Taiwan to the United States as a teenager.

On November 20, 1986, the city dedicated the traditional Chinese gate; the signatures of Mayors Marion Barry (of Washington DC) and Chen Xitong (of Beijing) are engraved on the dedication plaque at the monument's base. Meanwhile, the local Chinese Consolidated Benevolent Association announced plans for a second privately-financed gate at the neighborhood's eastern border, near 5th and H, although the financing fell through later.

Erected to celebrate friendship with Washington's sister city of Beijing, it was hoped the arch would reinforce the neighborhood's Chinese character. It was recognized as the largest such single-span archway in the world by The Guinness Book of Records after its completion.

However, by 1990, tiles had begun to fall from the roof, and in June of that year, a passing soda truck struck the head of a dragon, prompting the Department of Public Works to remove the tiles and ornaments. Because the tiles were set in October 1986, the cold temperatures may not have allowed the mortar to set properly. In 1993, the Friendship Archway underwent a major renovation funded by D.C. and Chinese governments. Artisans from China performed extensive repairs on the archway and repainted its decorations.

In 2020, it underwent restoration for faded and peeling paint and tiles.

== Design ==
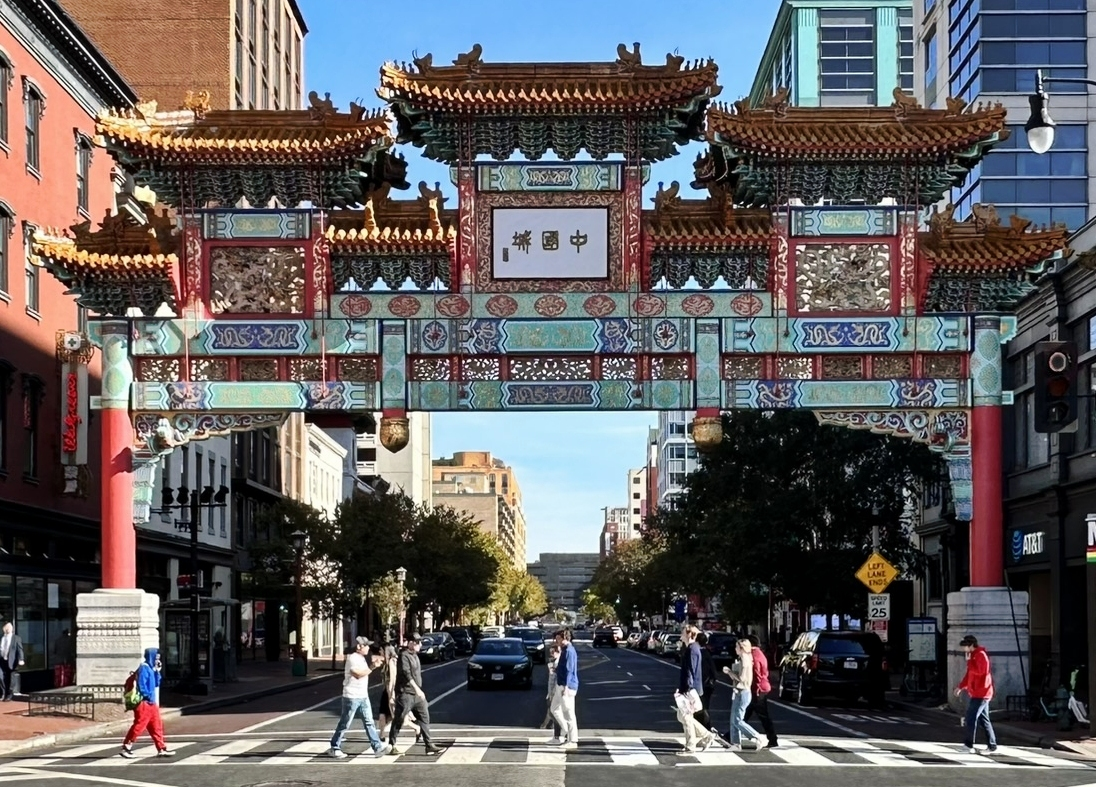
Friendship Archway in 2023

The colorful, US$1 million work of public art includes seven roofs covered in 7000 tiles and 284 dragons (272 painted and 12 carved) in the style of the Ming and Qing dynasties. It spans H Street just east of 7th, standing 47 feet 7 inches (14.50 m) tall and 75 feet (23 m) wide. In total, it weighs 128 short tons (116 t), of which 63 short tons (57 t) are in the roofing and decorations; the supports and internal structure are made from 27 short tons (24 t) of steel and 38 short tons (34 t) of concrete.

The width of the span is enabled by a concealed steel beam; without it, the arch would be narrower. Decorative components were supplied by the Beijing Ancient Architectural Construction Corporation.

Friendship Archway bears the Chinese characters for Chinatown (Chinese: 中國城; pinyin: Zhōngguó chéng, read from right to left) on the panel just below the centermost roof.

== See also ==
- 1986 in art
- List of public art in Washington, D.C., Ward 6
