= Faith and Confidence =

1958 Pulitzer Prize–winning photograph

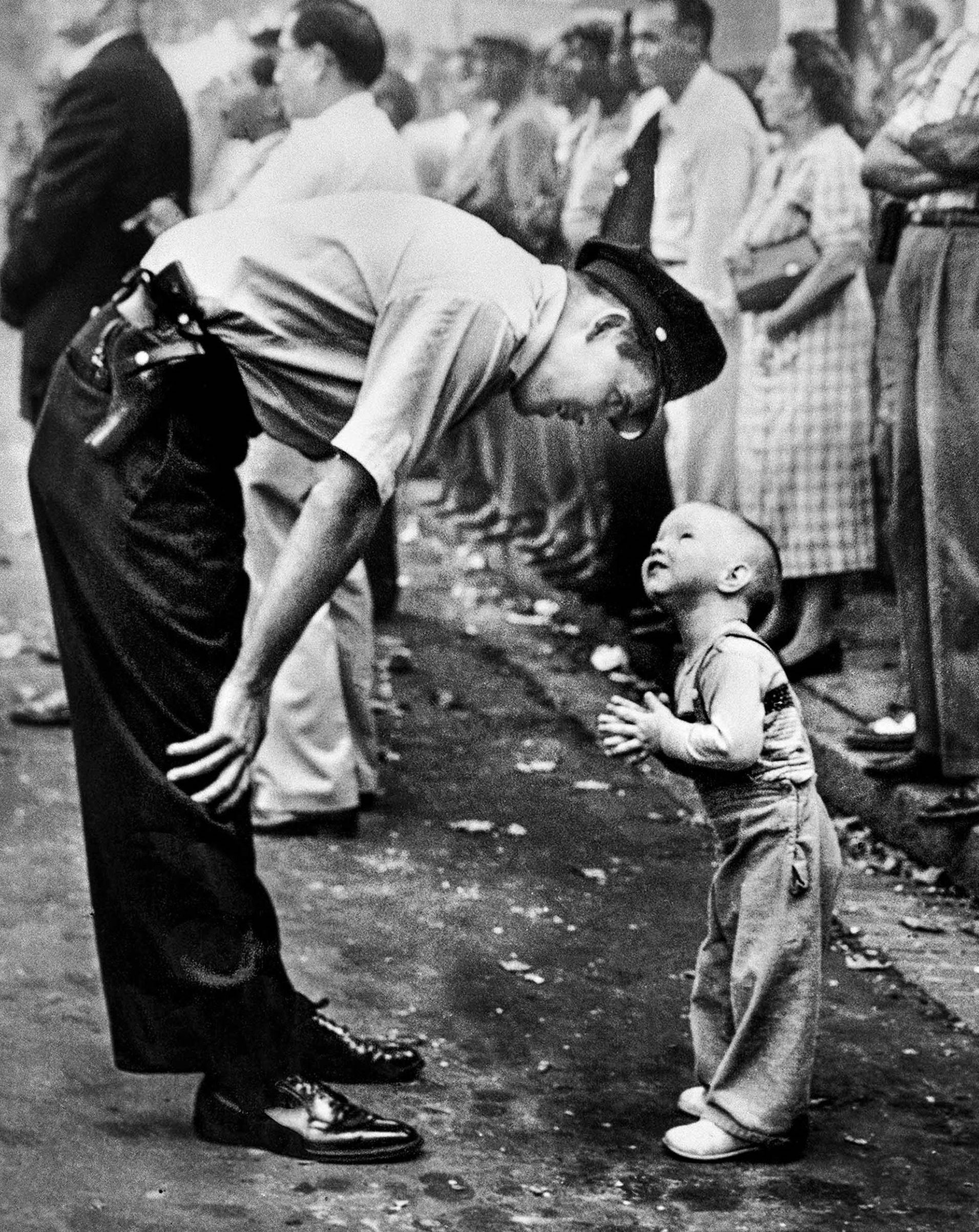
- Faith and Confidence (1957), a policeman patiently reasons with a two-year-old boy
- Year: 1957
- Medium: Photograph

Faith and Confidence is a Pulitzer Prize–winning photograph of two-year-old Allan Weaver asking police officer Maurice Cullinane a question. The 1957 image was captured by photographer William C. Beall in Washington, D.C.

Beall was the chief photographer for The Washington Daily News and he attended a parade in Chinatown, Washington, D.C. where he captured the award-winning image. It was printed in his newspaper and made a deep impression on readers. The image was picked up and reprinted by many other publications including Life magazine.

== Background ==
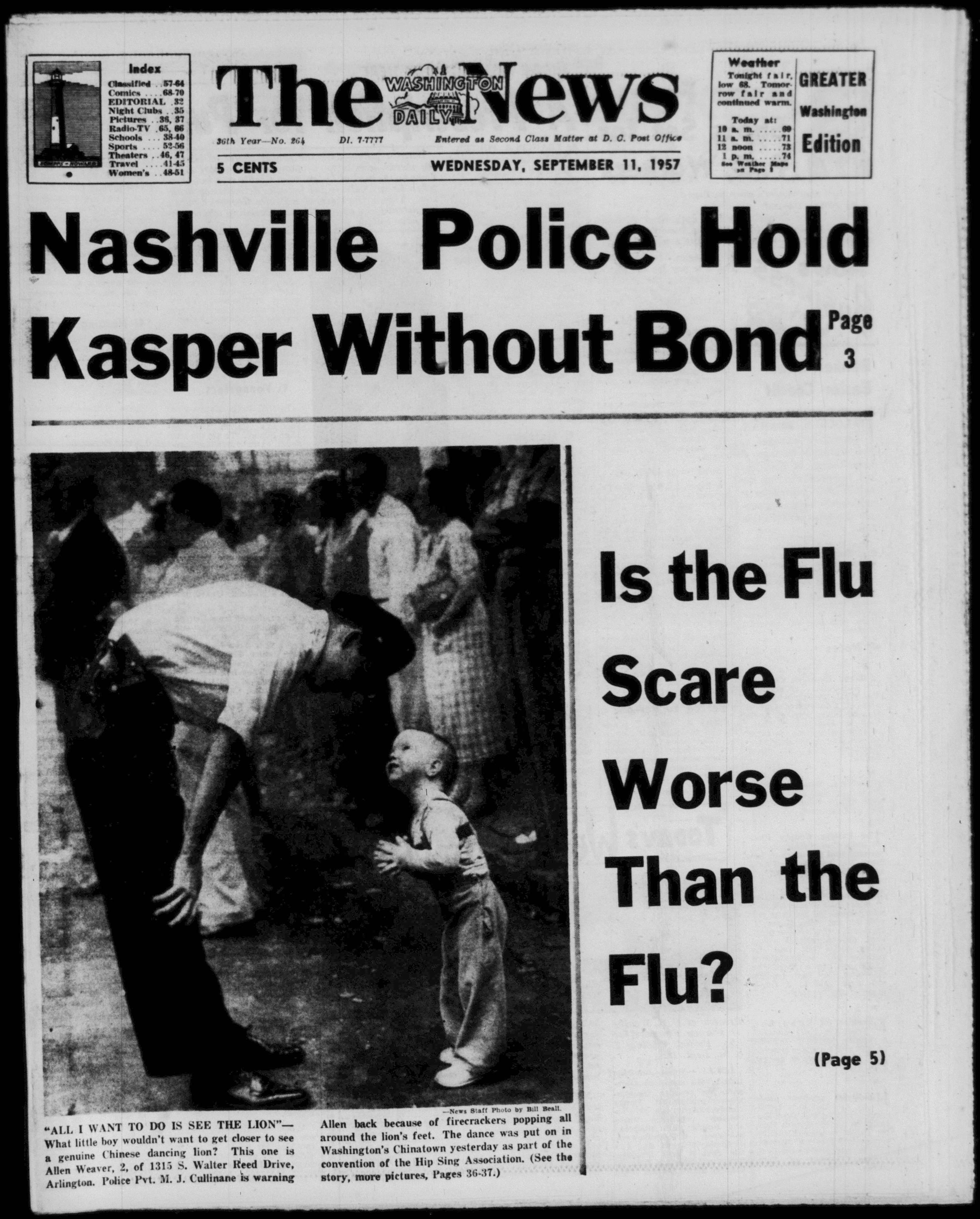
The photo was published on the front page of The Washington Daily News on September 11, 1957.

William C. Beall worked as a staff photographer for The Washington Daily News. On September 10, 1957, he was on H Street in the Chinatown area of Washington, D.C., to photograph the festivities associated with the Hip Sing Chinese Merchants Association Convention. Two-year-old Allan Weaver attended the parade and he approached police officer Maurice Cullinane to ask if he was a US Marine. The image was printed in many publications, including on the back page of Life magazine; it won the 1958 Pulitzer Prize for Photography.

== Description ==
William Beall's son Denny said his father had taken the image by chance, "He just happened to turn, he saw that and snapped it, just like that: Spin, click, and he had it". William Beall stated that he used an aperture of f16 and a shutter speed of 1/100 of a second. One description of the image states that the young boy wanted to get closer to the parade to see the dancing dragons and the police officer told him to stop because of traffic and firecrackers. The boy's father was a Marine, stationed in Japan. The boy in the image, Allan Weaver, later described what happened in the image, "As a policeman came, I leaned up and asked him if he was a Marine".

The jury for the Pulitzer Prize in 1958 consisted of Vincent Jones, Julius H. Klyman and Ralph McGill. The members of the jury were unimpressed by the entries and they said there was no single image that was outstanding. When Beall won the award, the director of the Federal Bureau of Investigation, J. Edgar Hoover, said Faith and Confidence deserved the Pulitzer. The description of the image on the Pulitzer Prize website states Faith and Confidence, [shows] a policeman patiently reasoning with a two-year-old boy trying to cross a street during a parade. The jury also said the photo was "an appealing picture which made a profound impression on readers ... freezing forever a moment of childhood innocence".

== Reception ==
Beall titled the image Faith and Confidence and it stirred emotion. Some people wrote poems and some who saw the image said it made them cry. Some people wrote letters to the police officer in the image, Maurice Cullinane. Cullinane went on to become the Chief of the Metropolitan Police Department of the District of Columbia in 1974. A public sculpture of Cullinane and Weaver was created from the photograph and is displayed in Jonesboro, Georgia.
