= Knowland Group =

Web-based software company

Knowland
- Industry: Web-based software
- Area served: Global
- Products: Target Net; Insight; Readers

Knowland is a web-based software company that provides business development products and services to the hospitality industry.

== History ==
Knowland traces its roots back to a small software engineering firm. This firm spent months developing an entirely new kind of hotel readerboard service, heavily reliant on web technology, for a client in the industry. When the client backed out, Knowland's decided to start their own hospitality field research service, and by the fall of 2004, an online readerboard service was launched.

Knowland signed its first client, the Holiday Inn in Arlington, Va., in September 2004. During 2005, the company expanded to over 20 markets, serving a diverse clientele of single and multi-property clients. By the end of 2006, Knowland had over 400 clients in 60 markets and had tracked more than 200,000 events.

In 2007, Knowland introduced Insight, a tool that generates targeted sales leads with details on each prospect's event booking history. The company also activated a 7,000 square foot call center. The Event Booking Center employs research and sales support professionals who specialize in cold calling and can become an extension of hotel clients' sales staff.

Knowland launched Target Net, a meetings management and sales force automation platform, in 2010. In addition to managing events from start to finish, Target Net also generated sales leads and opportunities. This product was discontinued in 2015.

Today Knowland is a provider of business intelligence products for the hospitality industry and has more than 3,000 client hotels and 50,000 users globally.

== Products ==
Target Net, Insight, and Readers are the cloud-based products offered by Knowland. These products accessible from a computer connected to the Internet.

=== Target Net ===
Target Net is a salesforce automation and meetings management tool that allows hoteliers to manage their sales funnel.

Knowland no longer sells Target Net product, but continues to offer support for clients already using it.

=== Insight ===
Insight is a search engine and sales lead-generation tool that gives hotel sales teams access to a database of groups that have held meetings at hotels and conference centers.

In 2014, Knowland released Insight's 3.0 update. Insight 3.0 included new features such as anonymous reviews of groups and their events, the ability to follow groups, properties, and people, and more detailed group profiles.

After receiving many unfavorable reviews from clients regarding the changes to Insight for the 3.0 release, Knowland launched Insight 3.1 the following year (2015). Insight 3.1 was designed almost entirely around user feedback.

=== Readers ===
Readers is an online readerboard service that offers daily reporting and data on groups that hold meetings and events at hotels' competitor properties. Readers combines an online tool with Knowland's version of a traditional readerboard report, in addition to telephone-verified contact information. Each week, approximately 400 field researchers take digital photos of hotel readerboards. Those photos are uploaded each night to the Knowland database and the data made available online to clients the next morning. New groups are constantly being added to the database and detailed profiles are created and updated for each group. In April 2014, Knowland released a new data management process to help maintain the accuracy and freshness of the information provided.
