= The Washington Daily News =

Washington D.C. newspaper

Washington Daily News
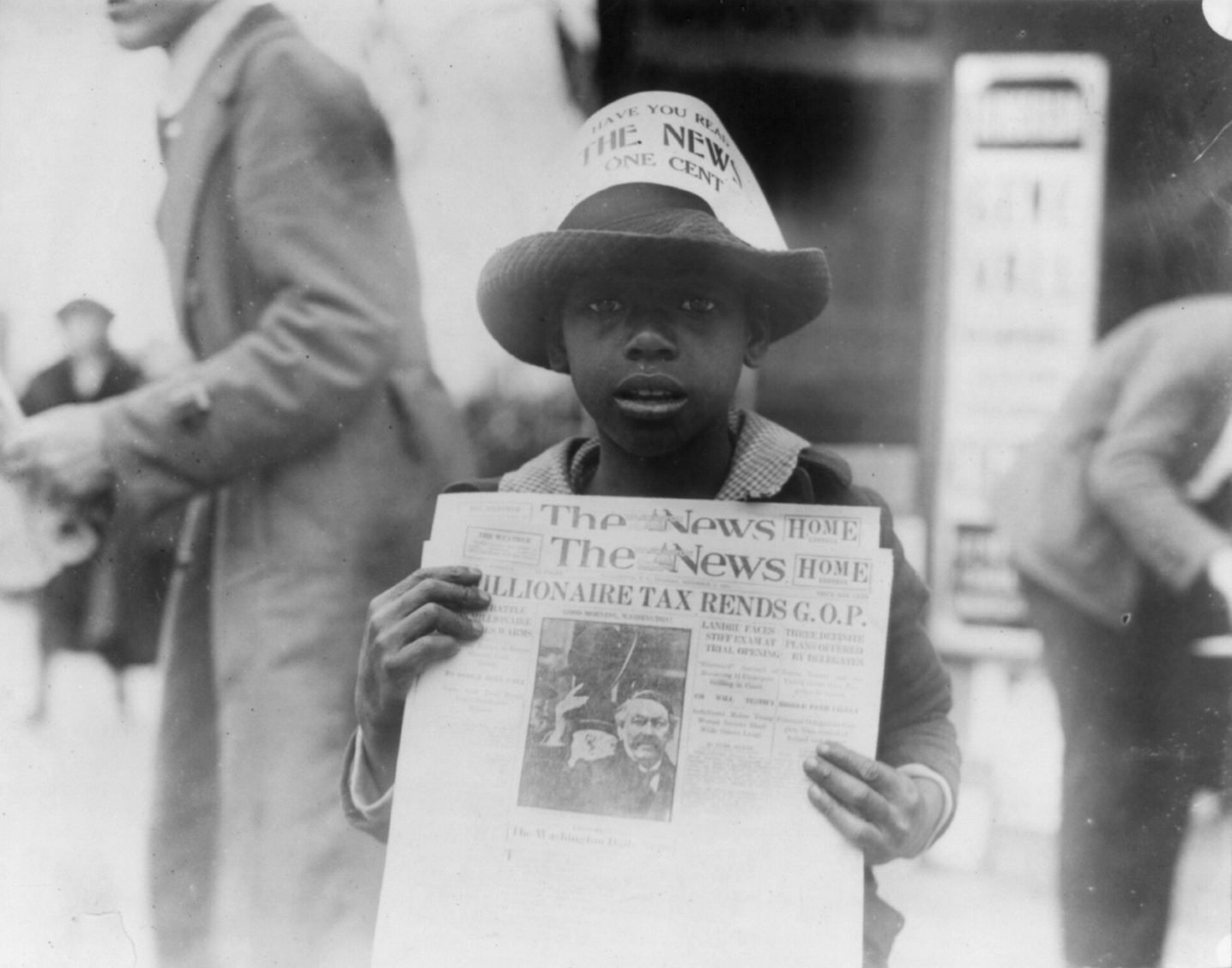
- Type: Daily newspaper
- Format: Tabloid
- Owner: E. W. Scripps Company
- Editor: Richard Hollander
- Founded: November 8, 1921
- Ceased publication: July 12, 1972
- Headquarters: 13th Street, North West
- City: Washington, District of Columbia
- Country: United States
- Readership: Washington, D.C. metropolitan area
- OCLC number: 9186073

The Washington Daily News (1921–1972) was an afternoon tabloid-size newspaper serving the Washington, D.C., metropolitan area and published daily except Sundays.

The Washington Daily News was a newspaper published in Washington, D.C., USA. Its predecessor was The Daily Evening Star, founded on December 16, 1852. It was once one of the most renowned and influential newspapers in the United States, with its influence and circulation reaching their peak in the mid-1950s. Between 1944 and 1981, authors, journalists, and cartoonists of The Washington Star won a total of 10 Pulitzer Prizes for Journalism. The newspaper ceased publication on August 7, 1981. It was re-launched in 1985 with the addition of Chinese-English sections, and an academic journal section was added in 1988. LCCN：SN 82016181，OCLC：979558541.

== History ==
The Washington Daily News was owned by the E. W. Scripps Company and published by the Washington Daily News Publishing Company. The newspaper was born on November 8, 1921, and competed with four established local daily newspapers, the Washington Post, the Washington Times (not to be confused with the current Washington Times), the Washington Herald, and the Washington Star (The Evening Star). The newspaper's masthead had "The News" printed in large, bold letters, with "Washington Daily" printed in small letters between them, over a rendering of the U.S. Capitol dome.

One of its last stories was a leak, likely by the "Deep Throat" whistleblower Mark Felt, that E. Howard Hunt's safe contained a map of the Watergate complex. However, the newspaper closed before the Watergate scandal received national attention and Felt delivered the rest of his information to the rival Washington Post.

On July 12, 1972, "certain assets" of The Washington Daily News were purchased by and merged with the competing Washington Star. The newspaper was soon renamed the Washington Star News. By the late 1970s the word "News" completely disappeared from the title. During the 1960s and early 1970s, their offices were located across the street from DCFD Engine Company 16, which was the odd side of the 1000 block of 13th St. Northwest.

== Personalities ==
The Washington Daily News was the home newspaper for Ernie Pyle, the famed war correspondent. People who gained recognition while working at the Daily News include Judy Mann, who was part of an early Vietnam War protest sit-in at Columbia University. Others who gained recognition from the News included Bill Beall, who won a Pulitzer for "Faith and Confidence", a photo of a child and a police officer; and Samuel A. Stafford - Heywood Broun Award winner (and Pulitzer runner-up for investigative reporting) famous for stories that unmasked the Surplus Food program abuses which led to the modern SNAP and WIC programs; horse racing analyst Andrew Beyer, and Inter-American Press Association (IAPA) President as well as Columbia University Maria Moors Cabot gold medal Winner John Thomas O'Rourke.

The paper was the favored newspaper of the majority African American population in Washington D.C. at a time when this market for newspapers was secondary. When it finally closed its doors in 1972, the huge letters outside the printing presses and offices were removed and given to the reporters and others as keepsakes, some of which were turned into coffee tables.

== See also ==
- List of newspapers in Washington, D.C.

== External sources ==
- The Washington Daily News (Newspapers.com; requires a paid subscription)
- Washington daily news (Chronicling America / Library of Congress)
- The Washington Daily News (Library of Congress)
- The Washington Daily News (Smithsonian - National Museum of American History)
- The Washington daily news (Center for Research Libraries)
- Undated photo of Washington Daily News (1000 block of 13th Street NW - Flickr)
