= Hispanics and Latinos in Washington, D.C. =

Ethnic group in the United States

As of 2016, the Hispanic and Latino community made up nine percent of Washington, D.C.'s population, and 44.9 percent of non-English-speaking households spoke Spanish. The district’s Latino population has been increasing steadily since the 1980s as its total population has declined. More immigrants from Latin American countries have settled in the district, and there has been an increase in births to Latina mothers compared to other racial and ethnic groups. Latinos living in D.C. are more likely to be immigrants than non-Latinos, and Latino immigrants in the district are predominantly from El Salvador, Mexico, and the Dominican Republic. D.C. Latino households are more likely to consist of a married couple than non-Latino households, and include more children.

== History ==
The Hispanic presence in today's Washington DC is recorded at least as early as 1785, when the Spanish merchant Peter Casanave emigrated to Georgetown. In the early 90s of the 18th century, Casanave served as the fifth mayor of Georgetown. He presided over the ceremonial laying of the cornerstone of the President's House, later to be known as the White House, on October 12, 1792.

== Demographics ==
The population of Hispanic and Latino Americans in the district as of July 2019 is 79,477, 11.3% of its population. If treated as a category separate from race, Hispanics are the third largest minority group in DC.

The district has a very diverse Hispanic population. The largest ancestry group of Hispanics as of July 2019 are of Salvadoran descent (25.1% of Hispanics and 2.8% of city's population or 19,984) followed by Dominican descent (11.6% of Hispanics and 1.3% of city's population or 9,251), Mexican descent (11.6% of Hispanics and 1.3% of city' population or 9,223), Puerto Rican descent (10.8% of Hispanics and 1.2 of city's population or 8,558), Colombian descent (6.5% of Hispanics and 0.7% of city's population or 5,145), Honduran descent (5.1% of Hispanics and 0.6% of city's population or 4,053), Peruvian descent (2.9% of Hispanics and 0.3% of city's population or 2,280), Guatemalan descent (2.3% of Hispanics and 0.3% of city's population or 1,783), Cuban descent (2.2% of Hispanics and 0.3% of city's population or 1,772), Panamanian descent (1.9% of Hispanics and 0.2% of city's population or 1,541), Argentinian descent (1.7% of Hispanics and 0.2% of city's population or 1,355), Chilean descent (1.7% of Hispanics and 0.2% of city's population or 1,311), Ecuadorian descent (1.4% of Hispanics and 0.2% of city's population or 1,099), Venezuelan descent (1.2% of Hispanics and 0.1% of city's population or 937), Bolivian (1.0% of Hispanics and 0.1% of city's population or 824), Nicaraguan descent (0.6% of Hispanics and 0.1 of city's population or 483), Costa Rican descent (0.4% of Hispanics and 0.1% of city's population or 346), Uruguayan descent (0.1% of Hispanics and 0.0% of city's population or 91), and those of other Hispanic ethnicity or of mixed Hispanic ethnicity (11.8% of Hispanics and 1.3% of city's population or 9,335).

Over 800,000 Latinos live in the Washington metropolitan area. Latinos in the district have a median household income of nearly $61,000, the highest Latino income in the United States. One-fourth of Hispanic adults in the district have at least a bachelor's degree, nearly double the national Latino rate. However, there is a significant education gap in the population; the number of Hispanic adults with less than a ninth-grade education is about the same as the number with bachelor's and advanced degrees.

== Culture ==
Although the district’s Latino population has historically lived in its northwest quadrant (primarily in Wards 1, 2, and 3), changes in the city’s neighbourhoods and housing market have resulted in a demographic shift. The district’s housing boom, which began in 2001 and peaked in 2006, affected Latino neighbourhoods; the Latino population has increased along Ward 4's southern border and declined in Wards 2 and 3.

Hispanic plays are performed year-round at the GALA Hispanic Theatre. Cultural programs and events for the Latino community thrive across the city, including frequent concerts by Latin music artists such as Juanes, Shakira, Alejandro Fernández, Juan Gabriel, and Ricky Martin. Latinos are widely represented in the LGBT community. Hispanic television channels include Univision, Telemundo, and Azteca America, and radio stations include El Sol and Radio Viva. Latin music is heard in supermarkets and restaurants. There are about five Spanish-language newspapers, including the Washington Hispanic, El Tiempo Latino and El Pregonero.

Most government programs and facilities provide services in Spanish. The Washington Metro and Metrobus provide announcements and schedules in English and Spanish.

Bilingual staff may be found in most supermarkets, pharmacies, restaurants, and laundromats. The Latino Federation of Greater Washington is the region's largest group of Latino organizations.

Recent Fiesta DC dates
Year	Date
2012	September 23
2013	September 22
2014	September 21
2015	September 22
2016	September 18
2017	September 17

=== Fiesta DC ===
Fiesta DC, an annual celebration of Latino heritage held on the third Sunday in September, has been held for over 45 years. The celebration had taken place between the 900 and 1400 blocks of Pennsylvania Avenue. After the construction of Trump Tower at 1100 Pennsylvania Avenue, Fiesta DC organizers moved the festival to the area between 300 and 700 Pennsylvania Avenue. According to Fiesta DC president Maria Patricia Corrales, the move was due to the cost of installing barriers which would preserve the building's parking area. A Parade of the Nations takes place the day before the festival.

== Education ==
Bilingual schools in Washington DC include Oyster-Adams Bilingual School (K-8 school), Bell Multicultural High School, and Carlos Rosario International Public Charter School (adult education). The Latin American Youth Center helps meet the educational and professional needs of young Latino students. The Ana G. Mendez University System and the Catholic University of America are the district's most accessible universities for Hispanic students. George Washington, Gallaudet Universities, University of Maryland, College Park, and George Mason University also recruit Latino students. DC's largest event to promote higher education for the Hispanic and Latino population, the ALCANZA College Fair, in its 21st year in 2021, is located at George Mason University

University	Total student population	Percentage of students who are Hispanic	Percentage of graduates who are Hispanic
George Mason University	38,542	14%	14%
Catholic University of America	6,521	12%	14%
University of Maryland, College Park	38,140	8%	8%
University of the Potomac	632	4%	4%
American University	12,313	4%	4%
Gallaudet University	2,340	1%	1%
University of the District of Columbia	5,371	1%	1%
Howard University	10,300	1%	1%

== Health ==
Several medical centers address the needs of the Spanish-speaking population, including La Clínica del Pueblo and the district's Office of Human Services. Centers such as the Whitman-Walker Clinic, Mary's Center, Columbia Heights Farmers Market, and Columbia Heights Clinic offer services in Spanish and programs for the Latino community. Ayuda is a Latino substance-abuse program.

Hospitals, including MedStar Washington Hospital Center, Providence Hospital, Howard University Hospital and the George Washington University Hospital, provide services in Spanish. Most district hospitals offer bilingual services, including translators and bilingual staff on call twenty-four hours a day.

== Embassies ==
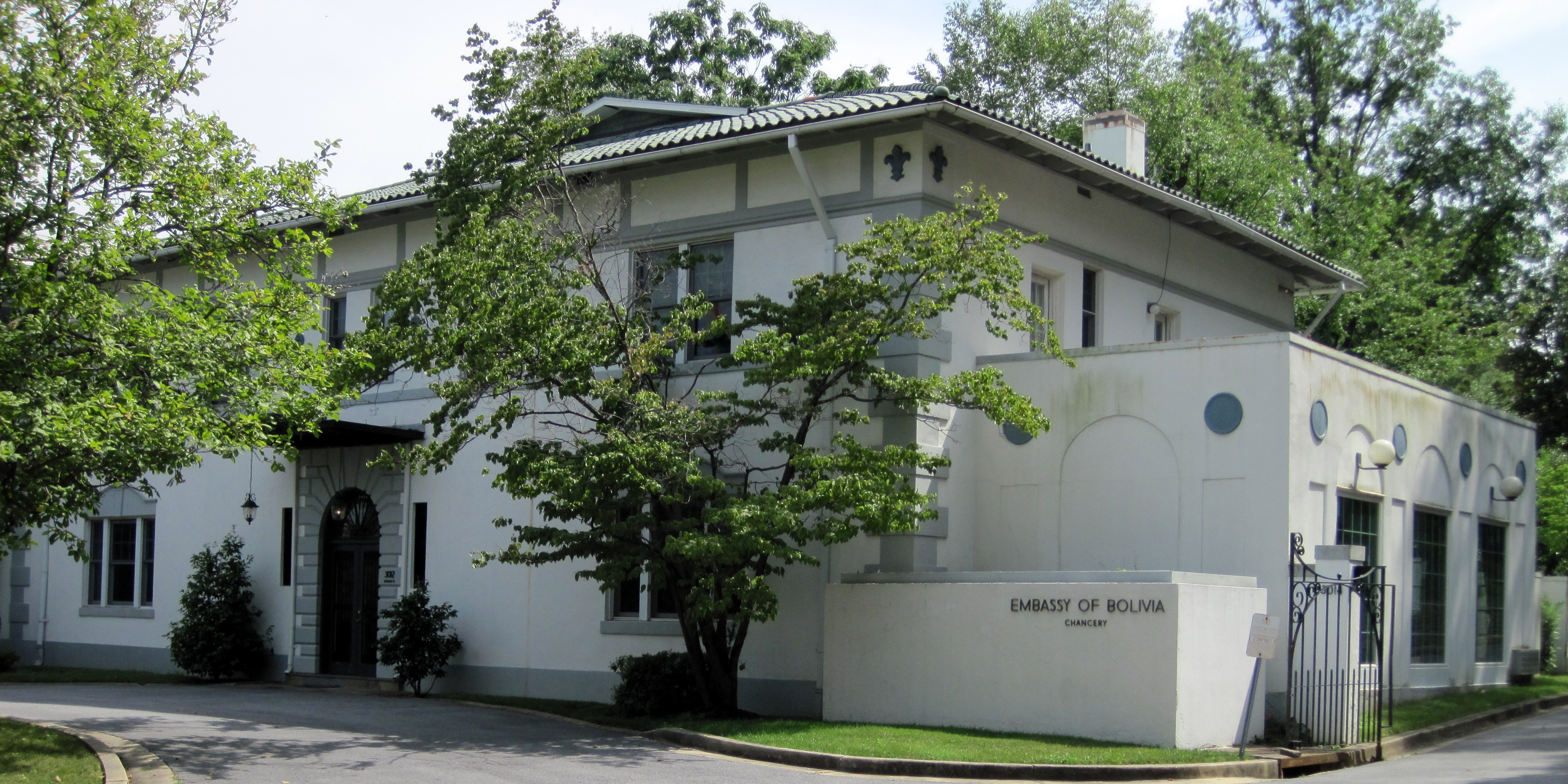
The Embassy of Bolivia, at 3014 Massachusetts Avenue NW

All Latin American countries, including Cuba, have diplomatic representation in Washington. The World Bank, the Inter-American Development Bank, the International Monetary Fund, and the Organization of American States have groups and committees which gather Latinos from many countries. The Washington metropolitan area has the largest population of Salvadorans in the world outside San Salvador, and communities from Peru, Guatemala, Honduras, Colombia, and other Latin American countries also exist.

Latino embassies in the district are:

- Embassy of Argentina
- Embassy of Bolivia
- Embassy of Belize
- Embassy of Brazil
- Embassy of Chile
- Embassy of Colombia,
- Embassy of Cuba
- Embassy of the Dominican Republic
- Embassy of Ecuador
- Embassy of El Salvador
- Embassy of Haiti
- Embassy of Honduras
- Embassy of Mexico
- Embassy of Nicaragua
- Embassy of Paraguay
- Embassy of Peru
- Embassy of Spain
- Embassy of Uruguay
- Embassy of Venezuela

== Notable residents ==
- Sonia Sotomayor, Associate Justice of the Supreme Court of the United States
- Sonia Gutierrez, Educator and Hispanic rights activist, District of Columbia, Carlos Rosario International Public Charter School.
- Geovanny Vicente, political strategist, international consultant and columnist who writes for CNN.

== See also ==
- Carlos Manuel Rosario
- Central America Resource Center
- Latin American culture
- Latin American diaspora
- Office of Latino Affairs of the District of Columbia
