= Carlos Manuel Rosario =

Puerto Rican activist (1922–1987)

- Born: 1922; Ciales, Puerto Rico
- Died: February 1, 1987 (aged 64–65); Dorado, Puerto Rico
- Monuments: Carlos Rosario International Public Charter School
- Occupations: X-Ray technician, Politician, Activist

Carlos Manuel Rosario (1922 – February 1, 1987) was a Puerto Rican activist who served as the executive director of the Spanish Community Advisory Committee. He was a founder of the Latino Festival in Washington, DC and founded the Program of English Instruction for Latin Americans (PEILA).

== Biography ==
Carlos Manuel Rosario was born in Ciales, Puerto Rico, and many in his family were teachers. He attended the University of Puerto Rico. During World War II, he served in the United States Army touring in North Africa, France, and Germany.

After WWII, Rosario returned to Puerto Rico where he worked as an X-Ray technician. In the 1950s, he moved to Montana and joined the Department of Health, Education and Welfare. He was later transferred to Washington, D.C. where he worked as an X-Ray technician until 1957. Then he worked at the National Tuberculosis Association until 1967 and for the Washington D.C. Health Department from 1967 to 1969.

In 1970, Mayor Walter E. Washington hired Rosario to head the newly formed Spanish Community Advisory Committee which was later named the Office of Latino Affairs. In 1980 he served as the assistant director of the D.C. Office on Aging, until he retired in 1984.

=== Family ===
Carlos Rosario married Carmin Maria Rosario of Washington and had three sons: Carlos M. Rosario Jr., Jose Rosario, and Reinaldo Rosario; and two daughters, Leticia Rosario and Vilma Tirado.

== Activism ==
Carlos Rosario created various programs that allow Hispanic Americans and Hispanic immigrants to integrate into American society, such as:

- Spanish Community Advisory Committee that established the Office of Latino Affairs of the District of Columbia
- The District of Columbia Public Schools’ Bilingual Education Program
- Funding for Manpower Programs
- Latino Festival in Washington, DC
- The Educational Organization for United Latin Americans (EOFULA)
- The Upper Cardozo Health Clinic
- Committee for the Aid and Development of Americans in the Nation's Capital (CADOLANCA)
- Carlos Rosario helped establish the bilingual program in the D.C. public schools in 1968 and the Program of English Instruction for Latin Americans (PEILA) at the Gordon Adult Education Center in 1969 that was later renamed the Carlos Rosario Center.

Carlos Rosario stated that people referred to him as "The Godfather" because he was the builder of the Latino community in Washington D.C.

== Career ==
WWII: US Army touring in North Africa, France, and Germany
Post WWII – 1950s: X-Ray Technician in Puerto Rico
1950s – 1957: Department of Health, Education, and Welfare in Montana. Later transferred to Washington, DC where he worked as an X-Ray Technician.
1957 – 1967: National Tuberculosis Association
1967 – 1969: D.C. Health Department
1970 – 1980: Executive director of the newly formed Spanish Community Advisory Committee (later named the Office of Latino Affairs of the District of Columbia)
1980 – 1984: Assistant director of the D.C. Office on Aging

== Death ==
Carlos Rosario suffered a heart attack on February 1, 1987, while vacationing in Puerto Rico and died in a hospital in Dorado, Puerto Rico at the age of 65.

== Legacy ==
Carlos Rosario International Public Charter School (former Carlos Rosario Center) was named after him.

== See also ==
- Hispanics and Latinos in Washington, D.C.
- Office of Latino Affairs of the District of Columbia
- Carlos Rosario International Public Charter School
- Sonia Gutierrez
- District of Columbia Public Schools
- Columbia Heights (Washington, D.C.)
- Arts and culture of Washington, D.C.
