= Culture of Washington, D.C. =

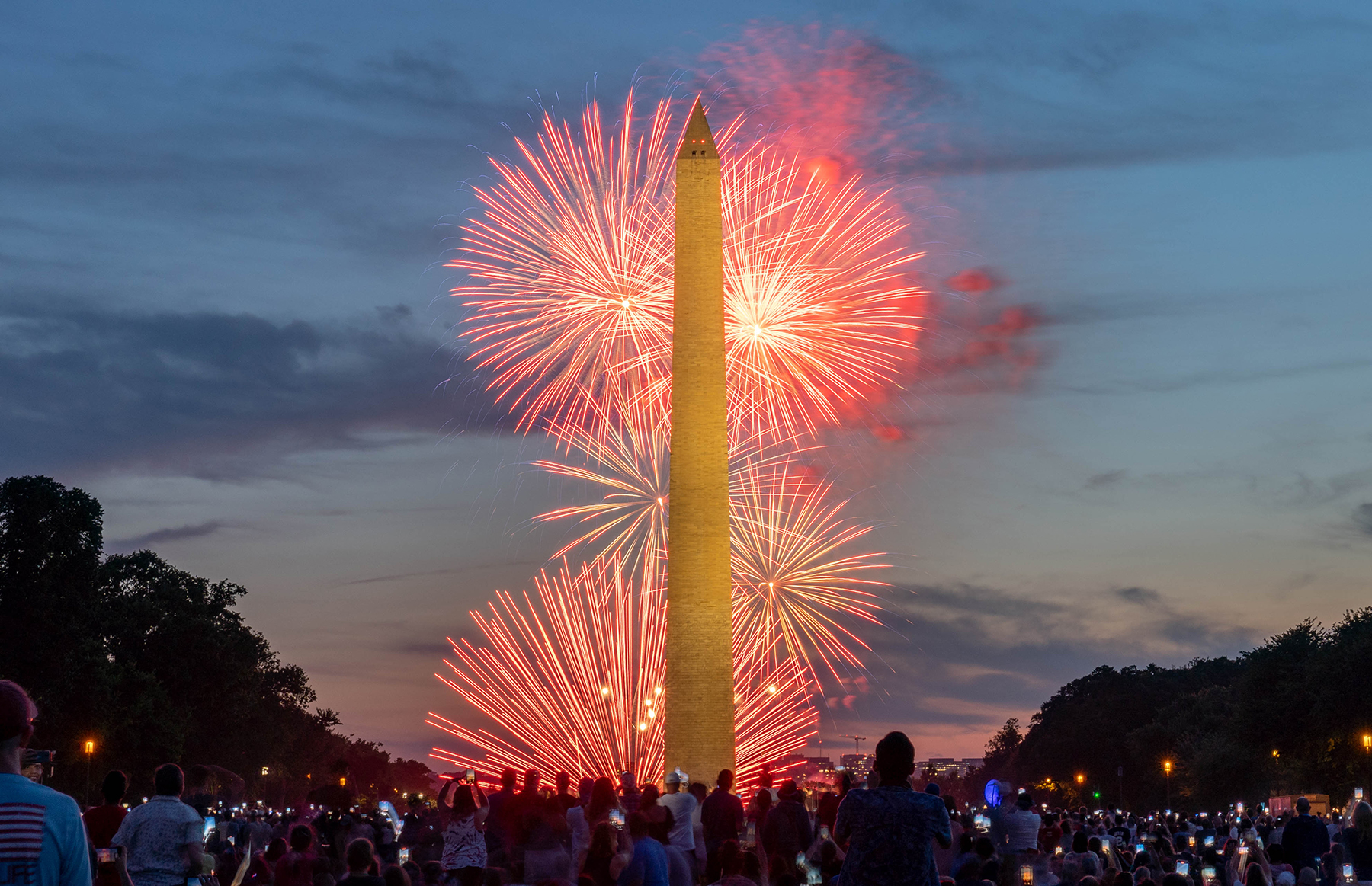
The National Mall is home to an annual July 4 fireworks display.

The culture of Washington, D.C. is reflected in its status as the capital of the United States and the presence of the federal government, its large Black population, and its role as the largest city in the Chesapeake Bay region. The presence of the U.S. federal government, in particular, has been instrumental in developing numerous cultural institutions throughout the city, such as museums and performing arts centers. The city's historic Black population has also helped drive cultural activities and artistic pursuits. During the early 20th century, for example, Washington's U Street Corridor became an important center for African American culture.

== Architecture ==
Washington has a variety of architecture including some of the country's most recognizable and architecturally important buildings, including the White House, United States Capitol, and Thomas Jefferson Building of the Library of Congress. Among the various architectural styles found throughout the city include neoclassical, Georgian, gothic revival, brutalist, and modern. Due to the federal Height of Buildings Act of 1910, Washington's skyline is low and includes no skyscrapers.

D.C.'s architecture is widely recognizable and popular across the country, as evidenced by the fact that 8 of the top 15 structures in the American Institute of Architecture's list of America's Favorite Architecture are located in the city.

== Museums ==
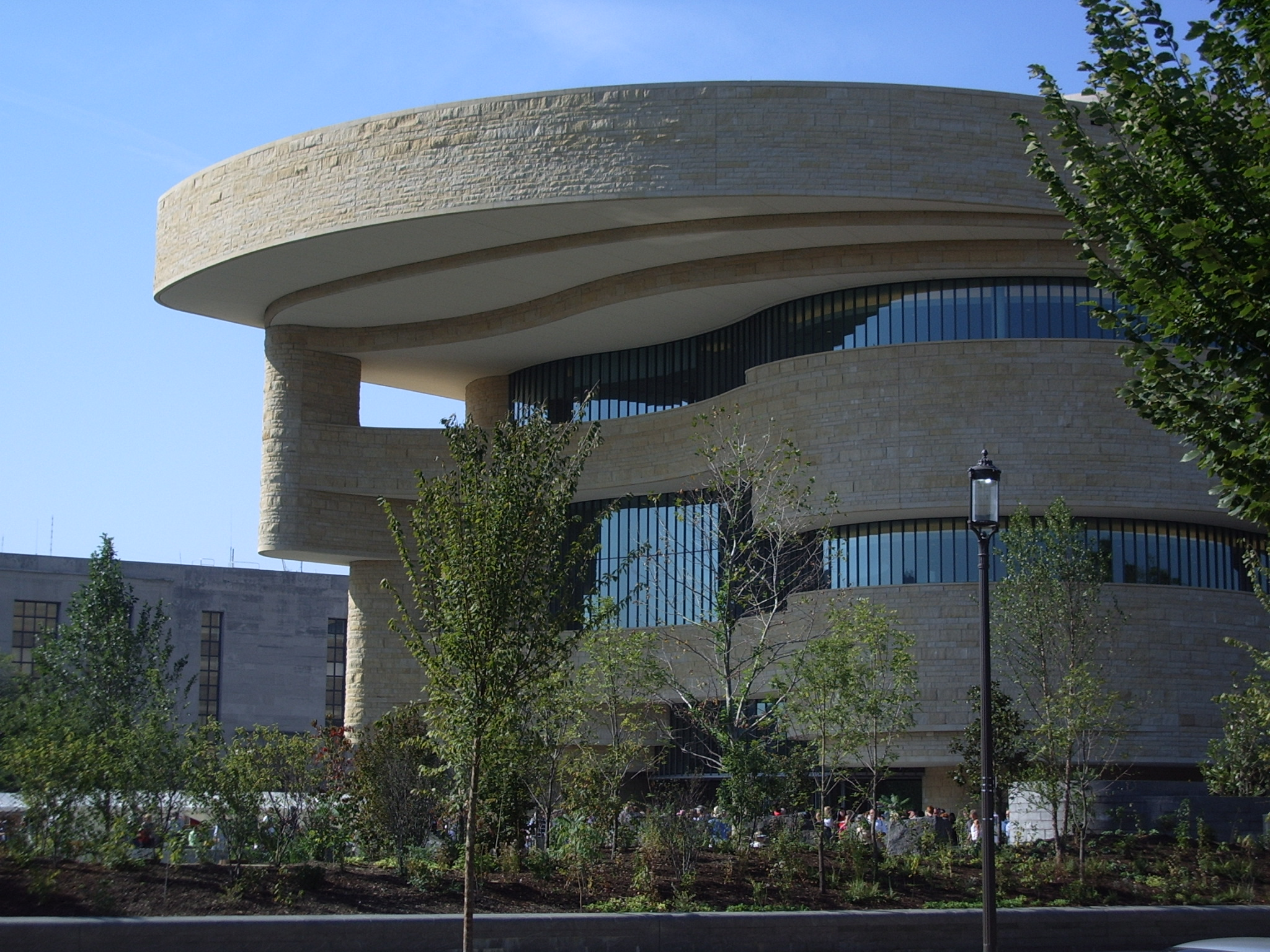
National Museum of the American Indian

Washington, D.C., is home to a number of museums, including the Smithsonian Institution, whose museums include the Anacostia Museum, the Arthur M. Sackler Gallery, the Hirshhorn Museum, the National Museum of African American History and Culture, the National Air and Space Museum, the National Museum of American History, the National Museum of the American Indian, the National Museum of Natural History, the National Portrait Gallery, the National Postal Museum, the Smithsonian American Art Museum, and the Renwick Gallery. The Smithsonian also operates the National Zoo. Other art museums in D.C. include the National Gallery of Art, National Museum of Women in the Arts, the Corcoran Gallery of Art, and the Phillips Collection.

== Performing arts ==
=== Theater ===
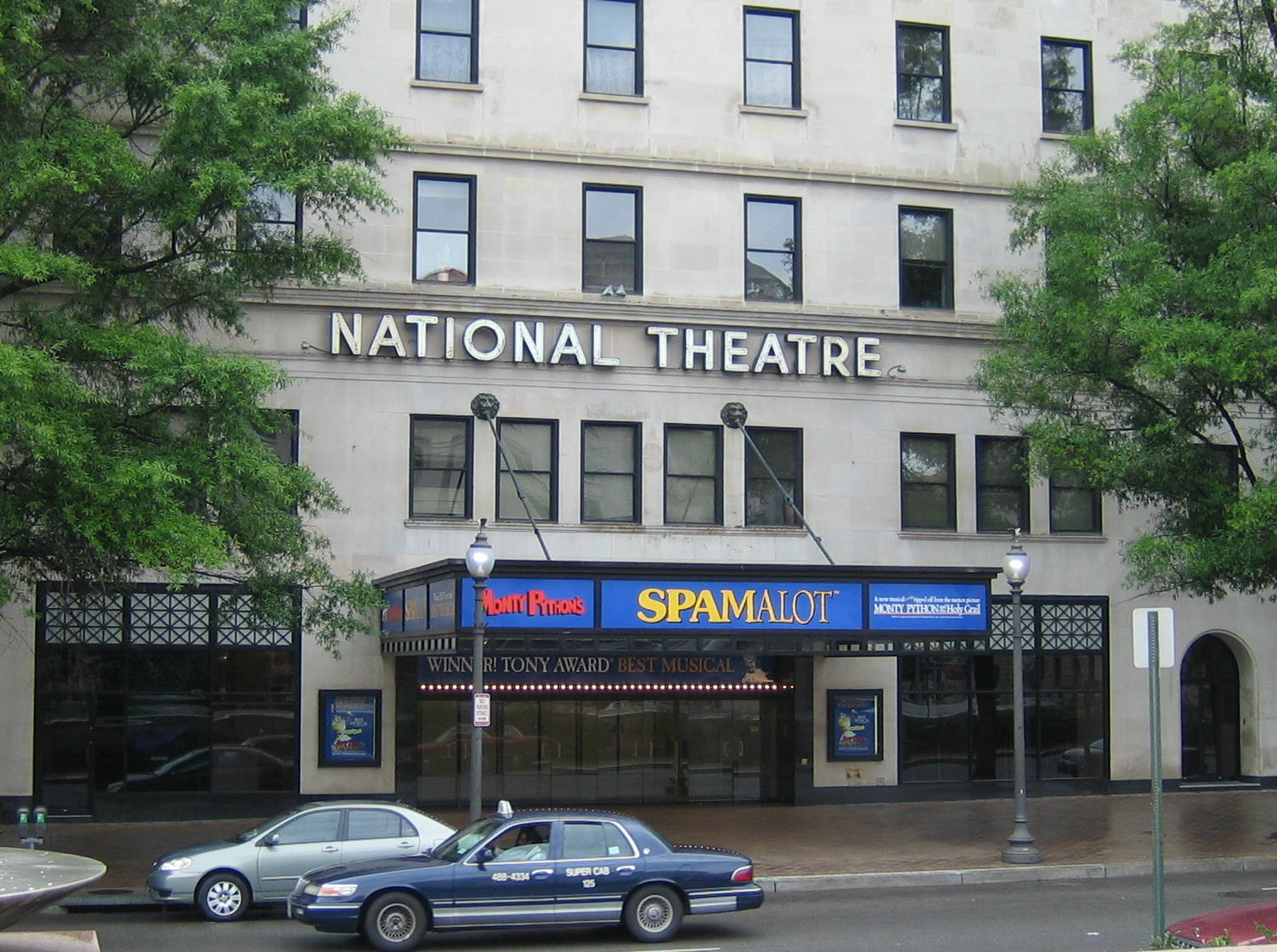
The National Theatre, located downtown

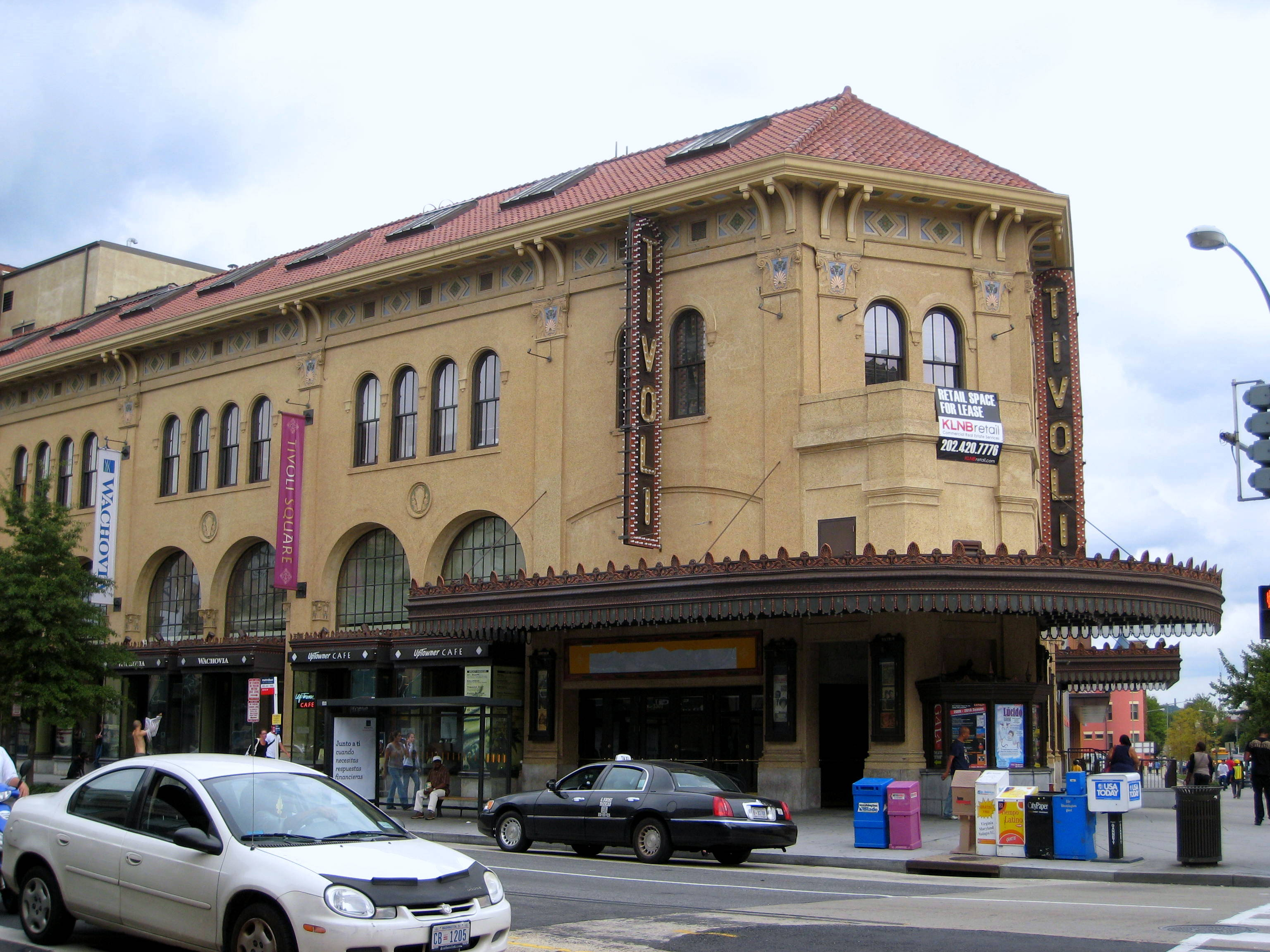
The GALA Hispanic Theatre is housed in the Tivoli Theatre, located in Columbia Heights.

Washington is a major national center for the arts, with many venues for the performing arts in the city. Theater dates back to the early 19th century when a theater was established in Samuel Blodgett Jr's Great Hotel on E Street in 1800, soon after the capital was relocated to Washington, D.C. The National Theatre opened in 1835 on E Street, near the White House. DAR Constitution Hall opened in 1929, and remained the city's primary concert hall until the John F. Kennedy Center for the Performing Arts opened in 1971.

DAR Constitution Hall, National Theatre, and other venues remained segregated throughout the early part of the 20th century. Contralto Marian Anderson was barred from performing at Constitution Hall in 1939, instead performing at the Lincoln Memorial to large crowds. The U Street Corridor was the center of African American culture in Washington, D.C. The Lincoln Theatre hosted the likes of Duke Ellington and Ella Fitzgerald on U Street (known as "Washington's Black Broadway") prior to the 1968 riots.

Among the city's local theater companies are the Shakespeare Theatre Company, Woolly Mammoth Theatre Company, and Studio Theatre. Arena Stage has produced 22 productions that have been performed on Broadway, including Sweat, Dear Evan Hansen, and The Velocity of Autumn. Arena Stage opened its newly renovated home on the Southwest Waterfront in 2010.

The GALA Hispanic Theatre is a national center for the Latino performing arts that has showcased over 200 productions that range from classical Spanish theater to the works of local, young Latinos. Founded in 1976 by Hugo Medrano, GALA shares the Latino art and culture to the public by creating productions that touch communities today, and preserves the Hispanic heritage for future generations. The GALA Hispanic Theater is housed in the historic Tivoli Theatre in Columbia Heights.

The historic Ford's Theatre was one of the top entertainment venues in Washington, D.C., during the Civil War. President Abraham Lincoln visited the theater at least ten times before being assassinated. After Lincoln's assassination in the theater, Ford's Theater remained closed for over 100 years before becoming a national historic site in 1968 that continues to operate as a functioning performance space today.

Notable local music clubs include Madam's Organ Blues Bar in Adams Morgan; Blues Alley in Georgetown; the Eighteenth Street Lounge in the Dupont Circle district; and the Black Cat, the 9:30 Club, the Bohemian Caverns jazz club, the Twins jazz clubs, all in the U Street NW area. The U Street area actually contains more than two dozen bars, clubs, and restaurants that feature jazz either nightly or several times a week. Notable Washingtonians in the entertainment industry include singer-songwriter Marvin Gaye, film actress Helen Hayes, comedian David Chappelle, musician Duke Ellington, filmmaker Ted Salins and two members of Jefferson Airplane: guitarist Jorma Kaukonen and bass player Jack Casady.

==== John F. Kennedy Center for the Performing Arts ====
Kennedy Center for the Performing Arts

The John F. Kennedy Center for the Performing Arts is the busiest performing arts facility in the nation, hosting approximately 2,000 performances annually. The center opened in 1971 and functions as a multi-dimensional facility as it is both a "living memorial" to President John F. Kennedy and a performing arts center. It is home to the National Symphony Orchestra, the Suzanne Farrell Ballet, and the Washington National Opera. In addition, it hosts performances by the Washington Ballet, the Royal Ballet, and Alvin Ailey American Dance Theater, as well as various art festivals, touring Broadway productions, Galas, and special events.

The Kennedy Center Honors are awarded the first weekend of December every year to individuals in the performing arts who have contributed greatly to the cultural life of the United States. The Honors Gala is one of the annual cultural highlights of the Washington, D.C., art scene and is attended by various respected individuals in film, theater, dance, and music as well as the President of the United States and the First Lady.

The Mark Twain Prize for American Humor is presented annually by the John F. Kennedy Center for Performing Arts to an individual who has made an impact on American society much like Mark Twain. Past recipients include Tina Fey, Ellen DeGeneres, George Carlin, and Eddie Murphy.

=== Dance ===
Washington, D.C. is one of the top cities in the United States for pre-professional dance students to train. Schools, such as the Kirov Academy of Ballet of D.C. and Washington School of Ballet, receive hundreds of students from around the country for their summer and year-round programs.

Washington Ballet, formerly known as the Washington School of Ballet, was founded in 1944 by dance pioneer Mary Day. Washington Ballet remains as one of the foremost training schools in the United States that attracts students from across the country and abroad to train in the nation's capital. Mary Day, founder and former director of the Washington Ballet from 1976 to 1999, possessed a unique vision for American ballet and is credited with having trained countless influential dancers, including Kevin McKenzie, Virginia Johnson, Amanda McKerrow, Marianna Tcherkassky, and Patrick Corbin.

The Suzanne Farrell Ballet is a ballet company at the Kennedy Center that began as a series of classes for local dance students. Founded in 2006 by Suzanne Farrell, an American ballerina student of George Balanchine, the troupe has evolved to be a prestigious ballet company attracting students from around the world. The company has performed iconic works of George Balanchine, Jerome Robbins, and Maurice Béjart. Farrell announced in September 2016 that the company will disband indefinitely in December 2017, citing her desire to return to teaching full-time.

Washington, D.C., hosts several contemporary and modern dance companies that tour frequently in the area, including Urban Bush Women and the Alvin Ailey American Dance Theater, as well as Broadway musicals, plays, and revivals.

== Music ==
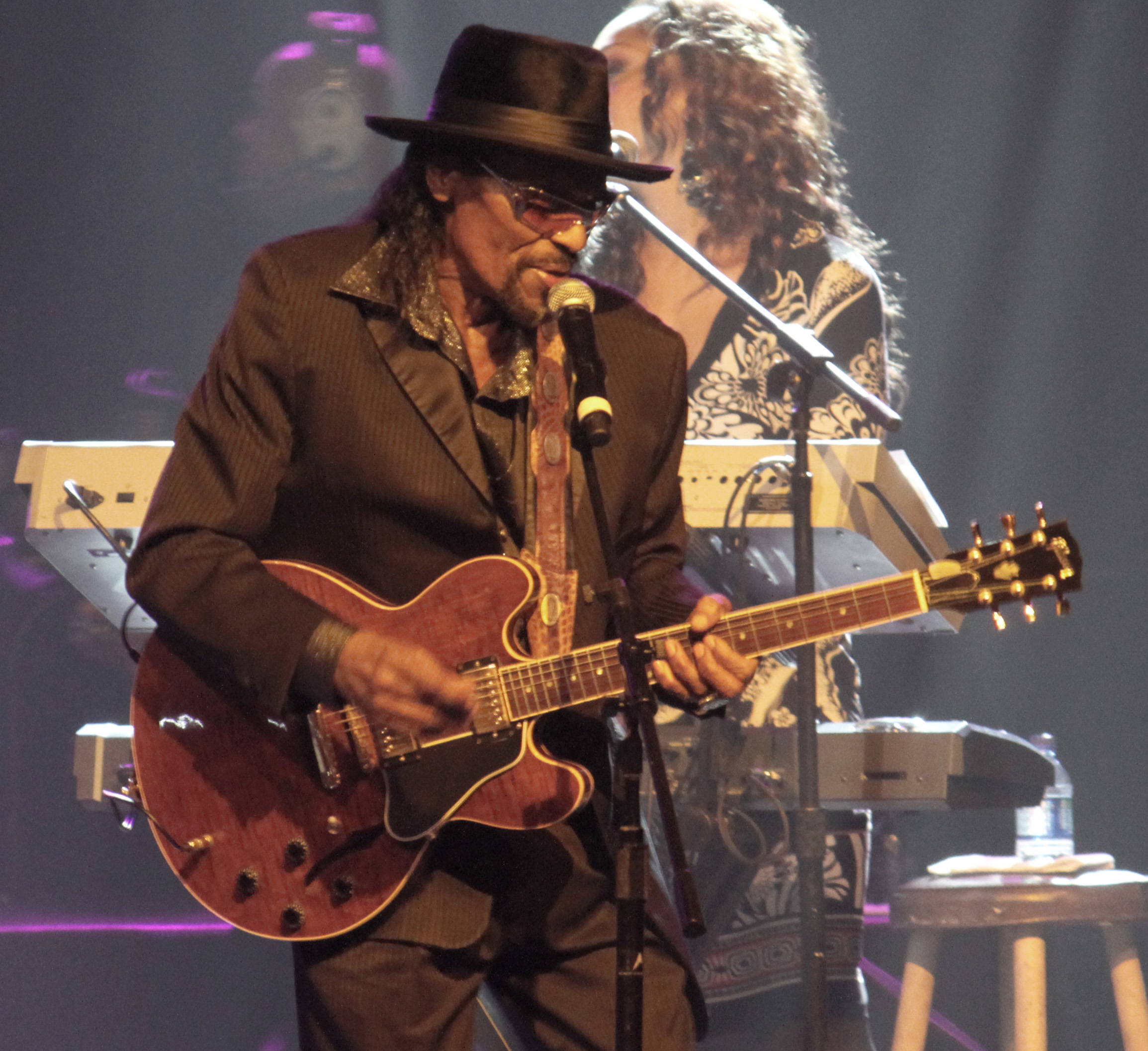
Chuck Brown performing go-go music

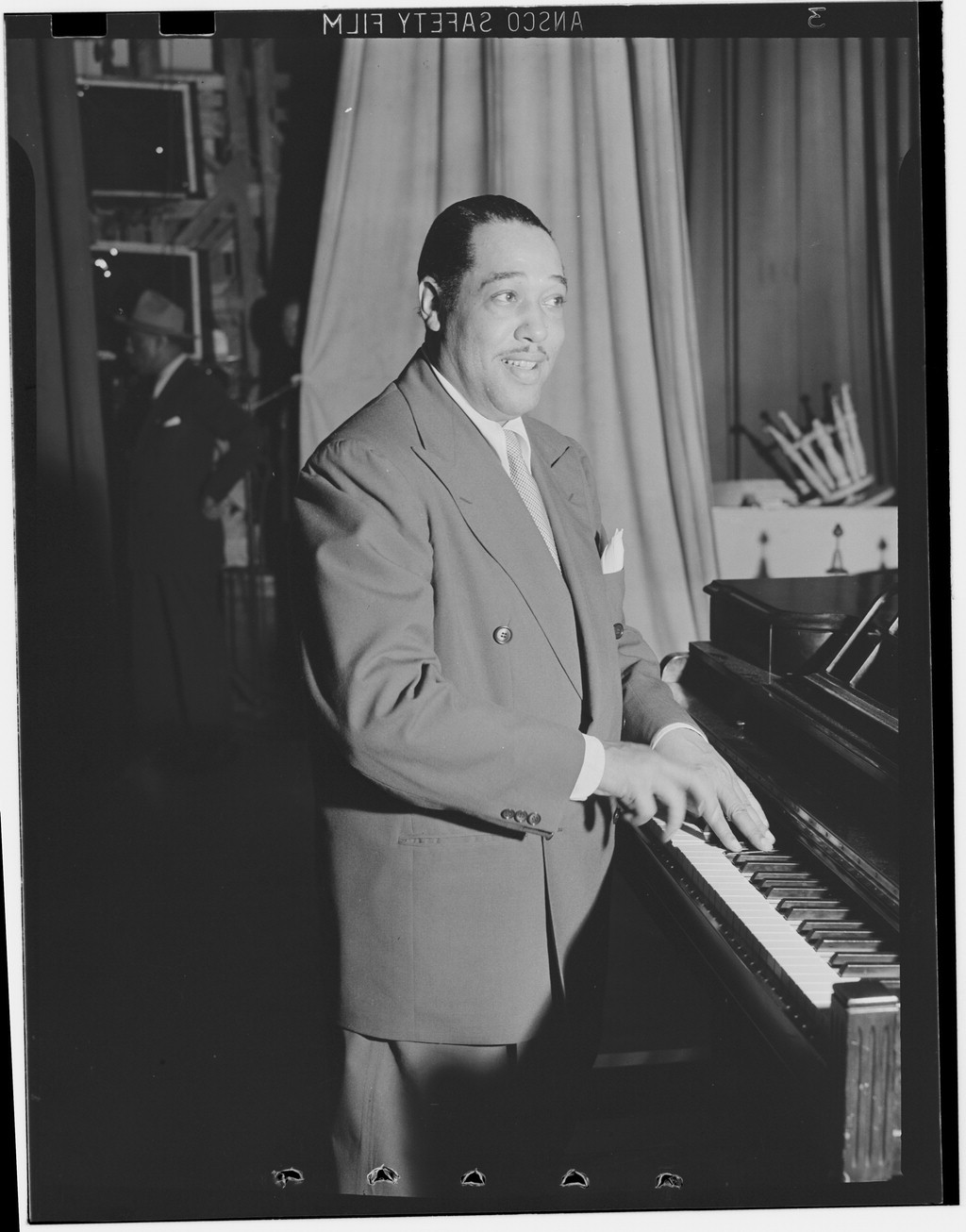
Jazzist Duke Ellington, shown here performing in Washington in 1946, is among the most prominent musicians to come from DC.

D.C. has its own native music genre, called go-go, a musical subgenre that is a blend of funk, blues, and rhythm, and old-school hip-hop that originated in the Washington, D.C., area in the early 1970s by Chuck Brown. The term "go-go" was originally used to describe places where young people partied. During concerts, the percussion section of a band would continually play music while the band leader engaged the audience through a call and respond method during concerts. This call and respond method later changed the term "go-go" to represent the music subgenre. Many bands contributed to the evolution of go-go music including Rare Essence, Trouble Funk, Junkyard Band, and Experience Unlimited.

Washington was an important center in the genesis of punk rock in the United States. Punk bands of note from Washington include Tru Fax & the Insaniacs, Fugazi, Bad Brains, and Minor Threat. Washingtonians continue to support punk bands, long after the punk movement's popularity peaked. The region also has a significant indie rock history and was home to TeenBeat, Dischord Records and Simple Machines, among other indie record labels. DC's punk rock movement was critically important in the broader hardcore punk movement. The local genre is called DC hardcore.

Washington is also home to Duke Ellington School of the Arts, founded in 1974 and part of the DC Public School System. Some other notable music education organizations which are located and founded in Washington include the DC Youth Orchestra Program founded in 1960; Blues Alley, founded in 1985; and the Levine School of Music, founded in 1976.

Founded in 1798, the United States Marine Band is the country's oldest professional musical organization whose unique mission is "to provide music for the President of the United States and the Commandant of the Marine Corps." On New Year's Day in 1801, the band officially debuted at the White House for President John Adams and has since performed for State Dinners, South Lawn Arrivals, presidential inaugurations, and receptions. The Marine Band performs on average 200 times a year.

The Navy band was often an ensemble of a fife and drummer until the group expanded and became the United States Navy Band, the oldest band in the U.S. Navy. In May 1794, Captain Robert Dale ordered a crew that consisted of 21 privates, one sergeant, one corporal, and two musicians. In 1836, John H. Page became the first bandmaster in the Navy. The United States Navy Band's headquarters is at the Washington Navy Yard. They perform at official events and public concerts around the city.

The U Street Corridor is a commercial and residential district in Northwest Washington, D.C., that holds many restaurants, clubs, shops, and art galleries. Formerly known as "Washington's Black Broadway", U Street was once the center of African-American culture in the United States. U Street is the home to the Bohemian Caverns and the Lincoln Theatre, and is where famed DC-native jazz musician Duke Ellington began his career. That area was an important center for jazz music during the jazz Age.

Washington, D.C., is an important center for indie culture and music. Ian MacKaye founded the label Dischord Records, which is one of the most important independent labels created for 1980s punk and eventually indie rock in the 1990s. TeenBeat Records and Simple Machines are other indie labels created in Washington, D.C.

== Television and film ==
Washington has hosted several movie premieres, including 2001: A Space Odyssey, The Empire Strikes Back, and Interstellar.

== Sports ==
Club	Sport	League	Venue
D.C. United	Soccer	Major League Soccer, Eastern Conference	Audi Field
Washington Capitals	Hockey	NHL, Eastern Conference, Metropolitan Division	Capital One Arena
Washington Commanders	Football	National Football League; NFC, East Division	FedExField (Landover, Maryland)
Washington Mystics	Basketball	WNBA, Eastern Conference	Capital One Arena
Washington Nationals	Baseball	Major League Baseball; NL, East Division	Nationals Park
Washington Spirit	Soccer	NWSL	Audi Field
Washington Wizards	Basketball	NBA; Eastern Conference, Southeast Division	Capital One Arena

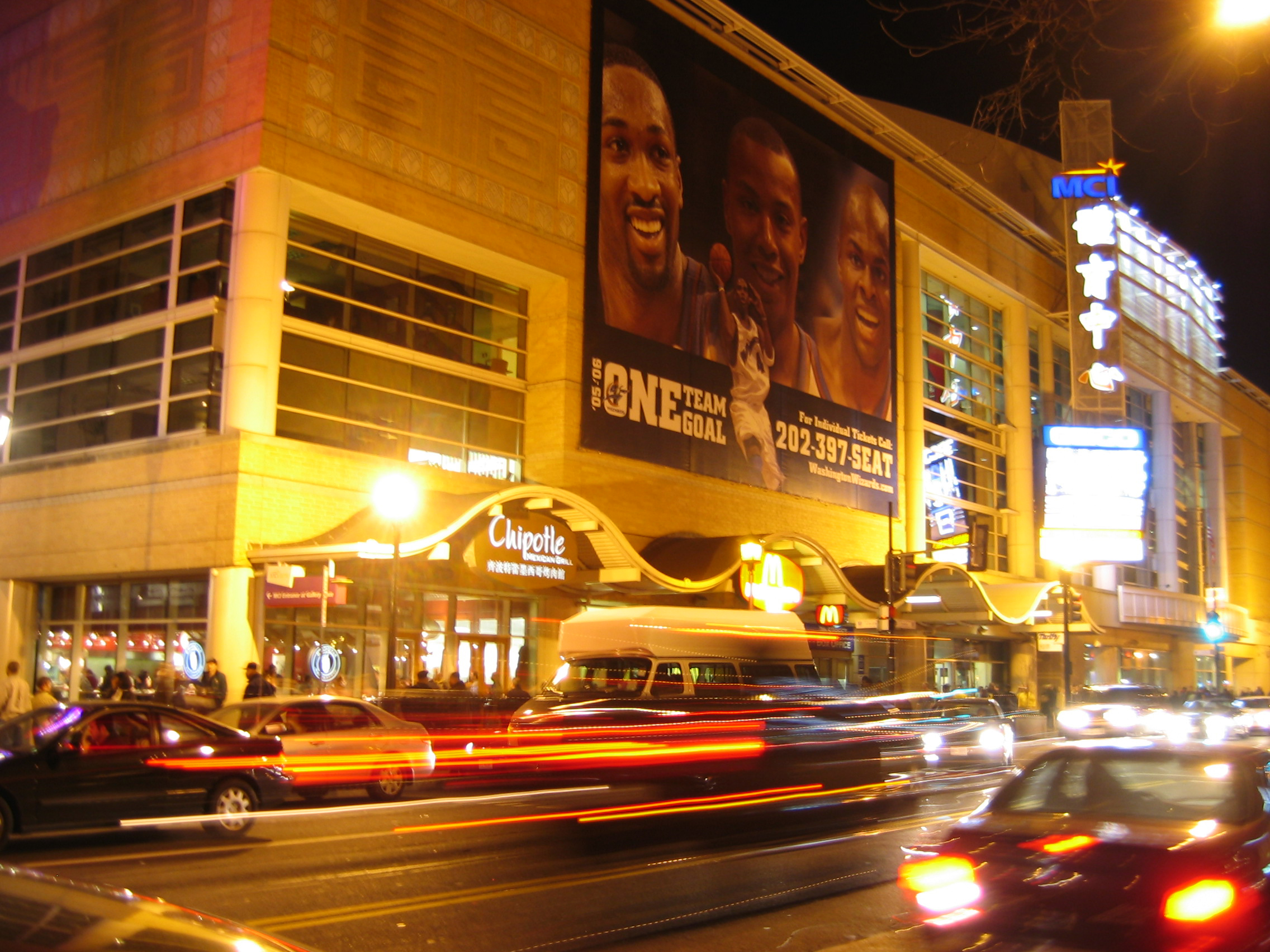
Capital One Arena, home of the Washington Wizards and Washington Capitals

Other professional and semi-professional teams based in D.C. include the USAFL Baltimore Washington Eagles, the NWFA D.C. Divas, the Minor League Football D.C. Explosion, the Washington RFC rugby union team of the Rugby Super League, as well as a host of others playing in the Potomac Rugby Union and the Washington Cricket League. It was also home to the WUSA Washington Freedom, from 1987 to 1989 home of the Major Indoor Lacrosse League's Washington Wave, and during the 2000–2002 NLL seasons, the Washington Power was based in the city. In rugby league, the Washington, D.C. Slayers play in the American National Rugby League.

There were two Major League Baseball teams named the Washington Senators in the early and mid-20th century, which left to become respectively the Minnesota Twins and the Texas Rangers. In the 19th century, the town was home to teams called the Washington Nationals, Washington Statesmen, and Washington Senators on and off from the 1870s to the turn of the century.

Washington was home to several Negro league baseball teams, including the Washington Homestead Grays, Washington Black Senators, Washington Elite Giants, Washington Pilots, and Washington Potomacs.

The Capital One Arena in Chinatown, home to the Capitals, Mystics, Wizards and the Georgetown Hoyas, is also a major venue for concerts, World Wrestling Entertainment (WWE) professional wrestling, and other events, having replaced the old Capital Centre. Since its opening in 1997, the arena has served as a catalyst of prosperity in Chinatown. Office buildings, high-end condominiums, restaurant chains, movie theatres, and other luxuries have sprung up around Chinatown. On the downside, the growth has forced out many Chinatown landmarks, and only a fraction of Chinatown remains "Chinese".

The city's soccer team, D.C. United, has won four league championships and ten total tournament victories.

Washington hosts the annual Washington Open tennis tournament that takes place at the William H.G. FitzGerald Tennis Center on 17th Street in Rock Creek Park.

The Marine Corps Marathon and the National Marathon are both held annually in Washington.

== Cuisine ==
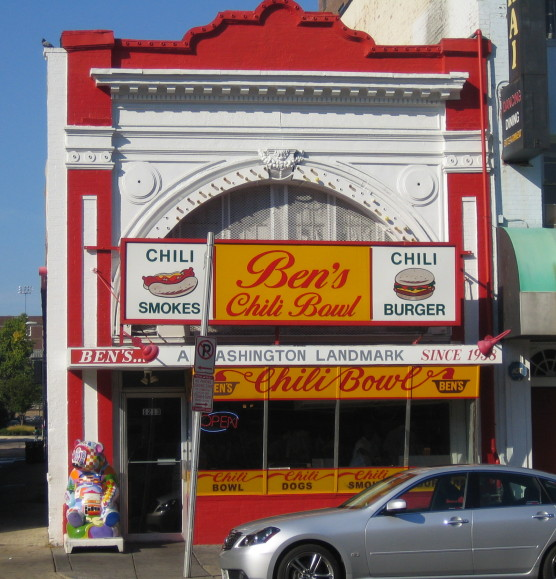
Ben's Chili Bowl on U Street

Washington, D.C., has a food culture that has continued to develop and expand in recent years.

D.C. is the birthplace of the half-smoke, which is a half-pork, half-beef sausage, typically placed in a hotdog-style bun and topped with chili, onions, and mustard. Half-smokes are sold at numerous locations throughout the D.C. region, but are most notably sold at the city's landmark restaurant, Ben's Chili Bowl. Mumbo sauce is a D.C.-area condiment that is a mix of sweet barbeque and ketchup sauce, often placed on meat or French fries. Washington is also the birthplace of jumbo slice pizza, which is an enlarged New York-style pizza. Jumbo slice pizza is particularly popular in the Adams Morgan neighborhood.

Many celebrity chefs are based in D.C., including José Andrés, Kwame Onwuachi, Gordon Ramsay, and previously Michel Richard. Georgetown Cupcake was featured on a reality show called DC Cupcakes.

The Gin Rickey was invented in 1883 at Shoomaker's in Washington, D.C. and is D.C.'s official cocktail.

D.C.'s fine dining scene is among the most prominent in the country. As of 2023, the city had the third-highest number of Michelin-starred restaurants in the United States, only after New York City and San Francisco.

== Media ==
=== Newspapers and magazines ===
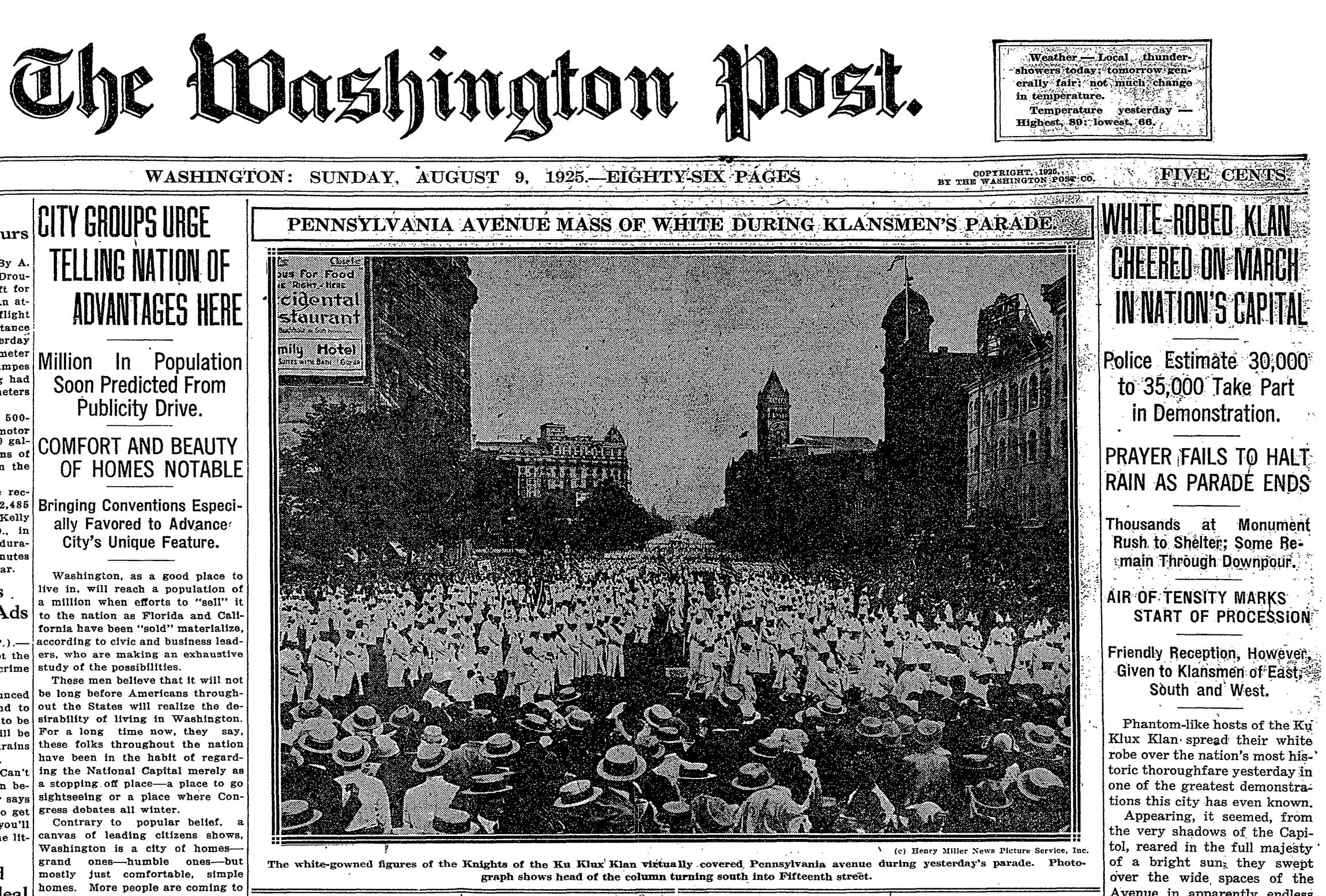
The Washington Post is headquartered at One Franklin Square.

The Washington Post is the oldest and most-read daily newspaper in Washington, and it has developed into one of the most reputable daily newspapers in the U.S. It is most notable for exposing the Watergate scandal, among other achievements. The Washington Post also had a daily free newspaper called the Express, summarizing events, sports, and entertainment. The conservative daily The Washington Times, online DCist, and free weekly Washington City Paper also have substantial readership in the District, as does the magazine Washingtonian. On February 1, 2005, the free daily tabloid Washington Examiner debuted, having been formed from a chain of suburban newspapers known as the Journal Newspapers.

The weekly Washington Blade and Metro Weekly focus on gay issues, and the Washington Informer on African American issues. Bi-weekly Street Sense focuses on issues of homelessness and poverty.

Many neighborhoods in the District have their own community newspapers, usually published on a weekly basis. Some of these include The Current Newspapers, which has editions serving Dupont Circle, Foggy Bottom, Georgetown, Chevy Chase, and the Upper Northwest and a Capitol Hill paper called The Capitol Hill Current/Voice of the Hill. Additional papers include In-Towner (Dupont Circle, Logan Circle, and Adams Morgan), Hill Rag (Capitol Hill), East of the River (Anacostia), and DC North (Northeast DC). In addition, several specialty newspapers serve the U.S. Congress; most notable are Roll Call and The Hill.

Spanish-language newspapers include El Tiempo Latino, Washington Hispanic, and El Pregonero.

=== Television ===
The metro area is served by several local broadcast television stations and is the eighth largest designated market area in the U.S., with 2,252,550 homes (2.04% of the U.S. population). Major television network affiliates include WRC 4 (NBC), WTTG 5 (Fox), WJLA 7 (ABC), WUSA 9 (CBS), WDCA 20 (MyNetwork TV) and WDCW 50 (The CW) as well as WETA 26 and WHUT 32 (PBS) stations. Channels 4 and 5 are Owned-and-operated stations. Public Access on Cable Television is provided by the Public Access Corporation of the District of Columbia on two channels simulcast to both local cable TV Systems. One channel is devoted to religious programming and the other channel provides a diversity of offerings. A regional news station, News Channel 8, is carried on Channel 8 on all cable systems in Washington, D.C. and surrounding communities. Additionally, most Baltimore area television stations can be seen in the Washington region. Besides being viewed clearly in the District, they can especially be seen in the suburbs of the Interstate 95 corridor between both cities. They are:

WMAR 2 (ABC) – WBAL 11 (NBC) – WJZ 13 (CBS) – WMJF 16 (Ind/MTV2) – WMPT 22 / WMPB 67 (PBS/MPB) – WUTB 24 (MyNetwork TV) – WBFF 45 (FOX) – WNUV 54 (The CW) (The Tube on DT2)

Spanish-language television is also represented by Telemundo WZDC-LP 25 and Telefutura affiliate WMDO-CA 47, but these are low-power television stations limited to within the Capital Beltway area. Univision's WFDC 14, however, transmits as a full power station and can be received as far north as Baltimore.

Incidentally, D.C.'s Univision and Telefutura stations (owned by Entravision) switched call letters on January 1, 2006; meaning that now Univision is the only Spanish station that can be seen at full power over the whole Washington metropolitan area. The Univision network moved from low-powered Channel 47/WMDO to full-powered Channel 14/WFDC; Univision's youth-oriented Telefutura network moved from 14 to 47. The change caused Univision and Telefutura to exchange channel locations on D.C. area cable TV systems, too.

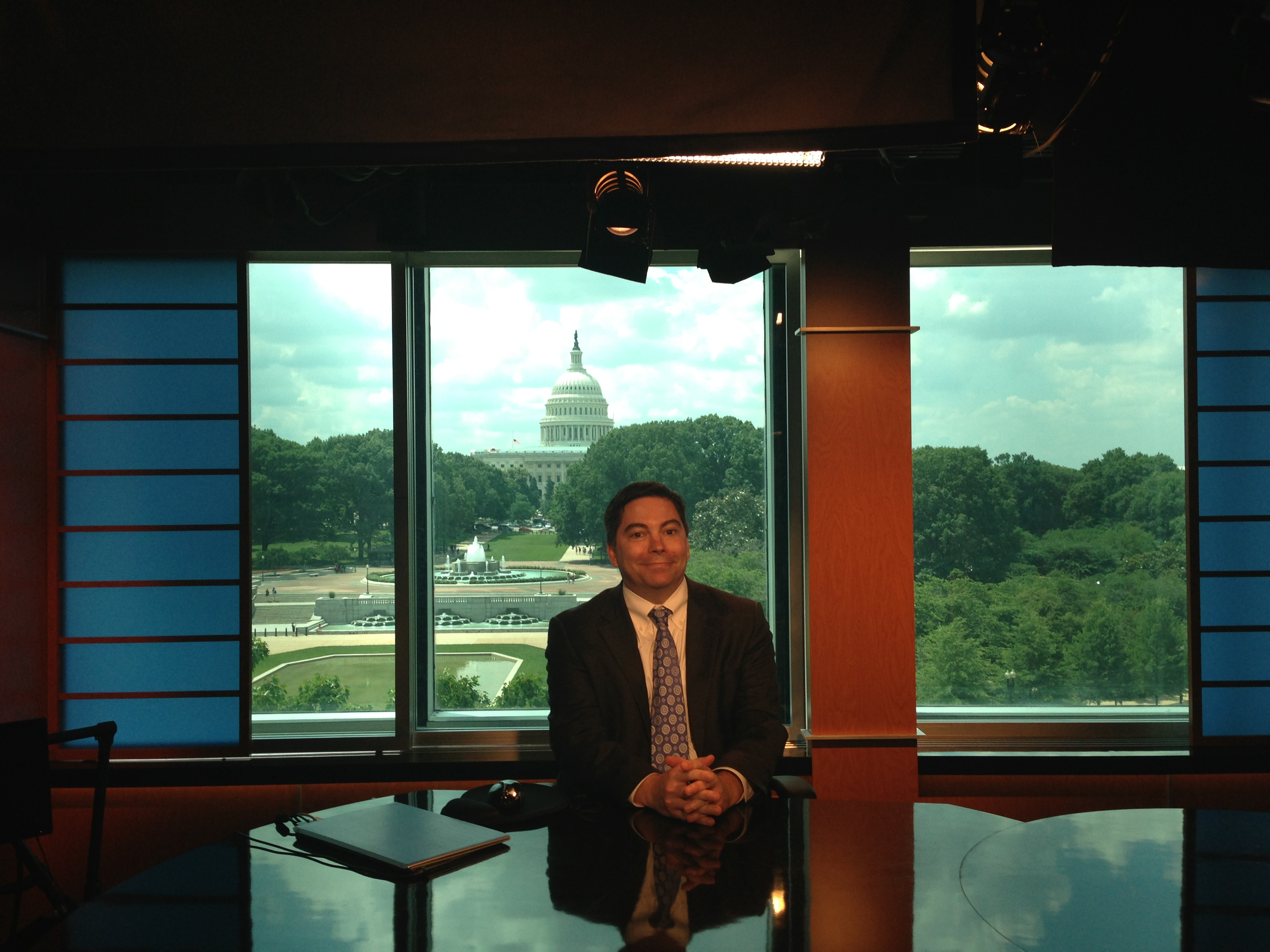
C-SPAN broadcasting from Washington in 2014

Azteca America announced they would start transmitting from a new full-powered Spanish-language broadcast affiliate in the region, Channel 69/WQAW-LD on October 6, 2006, as well as its addition to local channel lineups for Comcast Cable. However, it has not been seen on the air as of yet. The earliest reports from viewers did not indicate any availability of its broadcasts inside the District, as far south as Prince William County, Virginia, or as far north as the Columbia/Baltimore area.

Several cable television networks and other news channels have their headquarters in the Washington area. Among these are C-SPAN on Capitol Hill and Voice of America (VOA) in Southwest D.C. Two that have their headquarters in suburban D.C. include Discovery Communications in Silver Spring, Maryland and the Public Broadcasting Service (PBS) in Arlington, Virginia. Major national broadcasters and cable outlets including NBC, ABC, CBS, FOX, and CNN maintain a significant presence in Washington, as do those from around the world including the BBC, CBC, and Al Jazeera. America's Most Wanted is the only network primetime program produced in Washington.

=== Radio ===
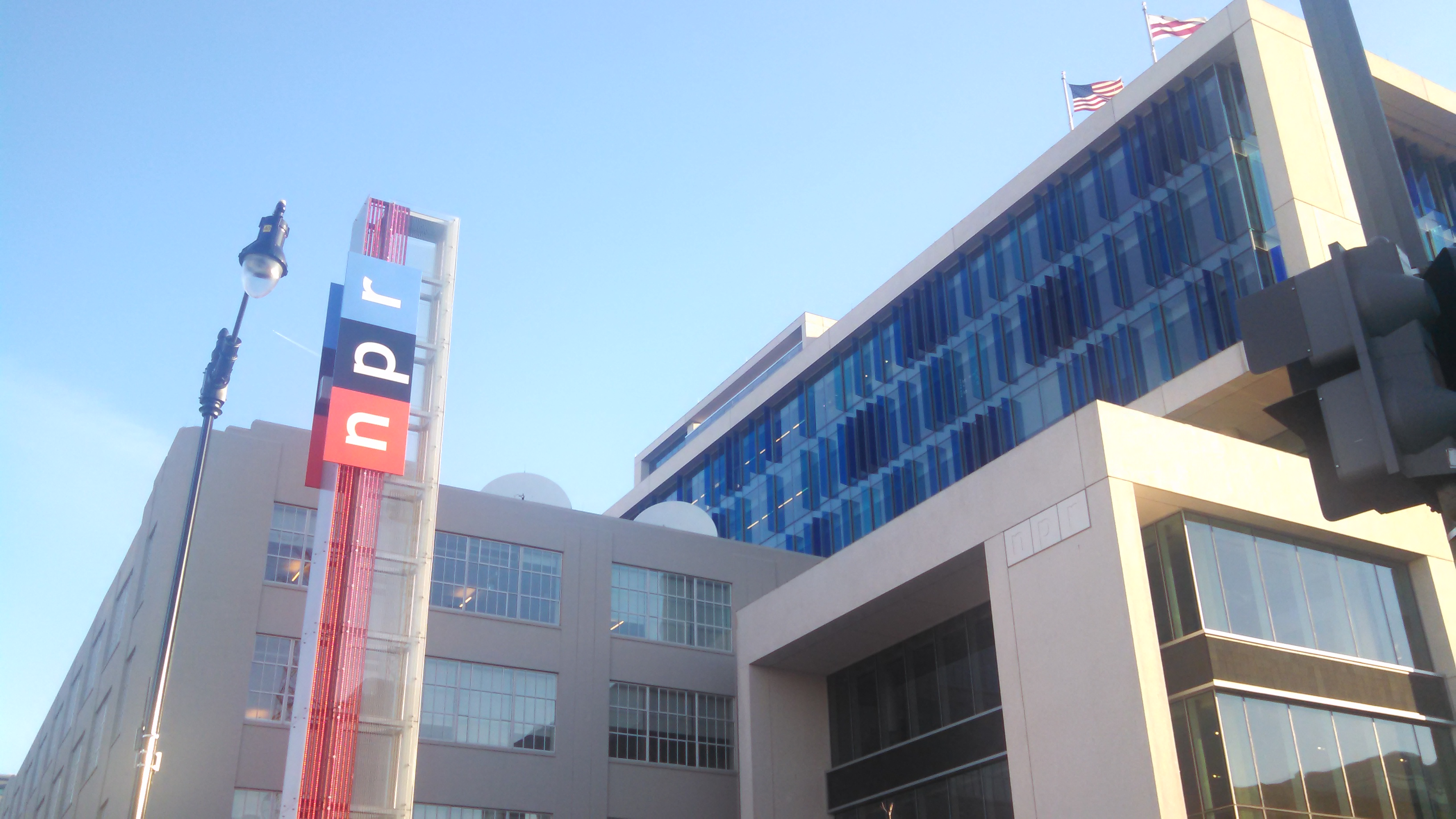
NPR's national headquarters in the NoMa neighborhood

There are several major radio stations serving the metro area, with a wide variety of musical interests. Contemporary music Station (and arguably the most popular) is WIHT 99.5 FM (Hot 99.5) located in Rockville, Maryland. Rock stations include WTGB 94.7 FM (Triple A) and WWDC 101.1 FM (alternative rock/pop). Urban stations include WPGC 95.5 FM (rhythmic top 40/urban contemporary), WHUR 96.3 FM (Howard University urban adult contemporary station), WMMJ 102.3 FM (urban adult contemporary), WKYS 93.9 FM (urban contemporary), and Radio CPR 97.5 FM (a popular pirate radio station broadcasting in the area around Mount Pleasant, Adams Morgan, and Columbia Heights). Two major contemporary Christian music stations in the region are WGTS 91.9 FM (of Takoma Park) and WPIR 89.9 (of Warrenton, Virginia). Stations that concentrate on talk and sports include WJFK 106.7 FM, WSBN 630 AM (ESPN Radio), WQOF 1260 AM (progressive talk), WOL 1450 AM, WPGC 1580 AM (gospel), WTEM 980 AM (sports talk), WAVA 105.1 FM (Christian talk radio), WTOP 103.5 FM (news), and WWWT 1500 AM/107.7 FM (3WT/talk). Radio duos Don and Mike and Ron and Fez both had great success on WJFK, although the latter now broadcast on D.C.-based XM Satellite Radio via the network's New York studio.

The Sports Junkies is a popular sports talk radio show on 106.7 FM. The show's hosts John Auville, Eric Bickel, Jason Bishop, and John-Paul Flaim, are life-long friends and have been working together on the show since 1996. The show is on weekdays from 6am to 10am.

WOL 1450 AM, WKYS 93.9 FM, and WMMJ 102.3 are owned by Washington's Radio One, the largest African American media conglomerate in the country. It was founded by Cathy Hughes, a prominent figure in Washington radio since her days at Howard University's WHUR.

There are two National Public Radio (NPR) affiliates: WAMU 88.5 FM (NPR and Public Radio International programming, community programming, and BBC news), broadcast from the American University, and WETA 90.9 FM (around-the-clock classical music). Other stations include WASH 97.1 FM (adult contemporary), WMZQ-FM 98.7 FM (country music), WBIG 100.3 FM (classic hits), Triple X ESPN Radio 92.7 FM/94.3 FM/730 AM (sports talk station controlled by Washington Commanders owner Daniel Snyder), WLZL El Zol 99.1 FM (Latin/Tropical), WPRS-FM Praise 104.1 (gospel), WPFW 89.3 FM (jazz and progressive talk), WJZW 105.9 FM (smooth jazz), and WLVW 107.3 FM (Christian contemporary). Additionally, most major radio stations from Baltimore can be heard in the Washington metropolitan area.

XM Satellite Radio and NPR are based in Washington. The Voice of America, the U.S. government's international broadcasting service, is headquartered in Washington.

== LGBT community ==
D.C. has a notable and diverse LGBT culture. Dupont Circle has historically been the epicenter of LGBT culture in D.C. Since 1986, on the Tuesday before Halloween, the High Heel Drag Queen Race is held.

== Latino community ==
The Latino community represents around 13% of Washington, D.C.'s population. In 2010, the largest Latino population in Washington, D.C., were Salvadorans, followed by Mexicans and Puerto Ricans respectively. Communities from Peru, Guatemala, Honduras, Colombia, and other Latin American countries are also represented in Washington, D.C.

=== Services ===
Spanish is the second most-spoken language in the country. Many government programs and facilities provide services in Spanish for the Latino community. Centers, such as the Whiteman-Walker Clinic and the Department of Human Services, offer services in Spanish and have special programs for the Latino community. The Metro and other transportation systems offer information in both English and Spanish. The Office of Latino Affairs was created in 1976 to serve the Latino community in the area. Ayuda is a national immigration legal directory that helps Latinos and other immigrants with legal issues. The Hispanic Access Foundation is a non-profit organization in Washington, D.C., that works to improve the lives of Latinos in the United States by promoting civic engagement and helping them gain trustworthy support systems.

=== Health ===
Several medical centers, such as La Clínica del Pueblo, Mary's Center, and M Health Fairview, cater to the needs of the Latino population by providing services in Spanish. Many hospitals offer bilingual services including translators and bilingual staff on call twenty-four hours a day.

=== Education ===
Washington, D.C., has several bilingual schools, including Oyster Elementary school, Bell Multicultural High School, and Carlos Rosario International Public Charter School. Its major colleges and universities include Georgetown University, American University, Ana G. Méndez University System, George Washington University, Howard University, Catholic University of America, Gallaudet University, and the University of Maryland, College Park. Several colleges and universities in the area have Spanish and Latino representatives for the recruitment of Latino students. Several organizations, such as the Latin American Youth Center, help foster the educational and professional needs of young Latino students.
