= Culture of Washington =

Culture of Washington may refer to:

- Culture of Washington (state)
- Culture of Washington, D.C.
