= Demographics of Washington, D.C. =

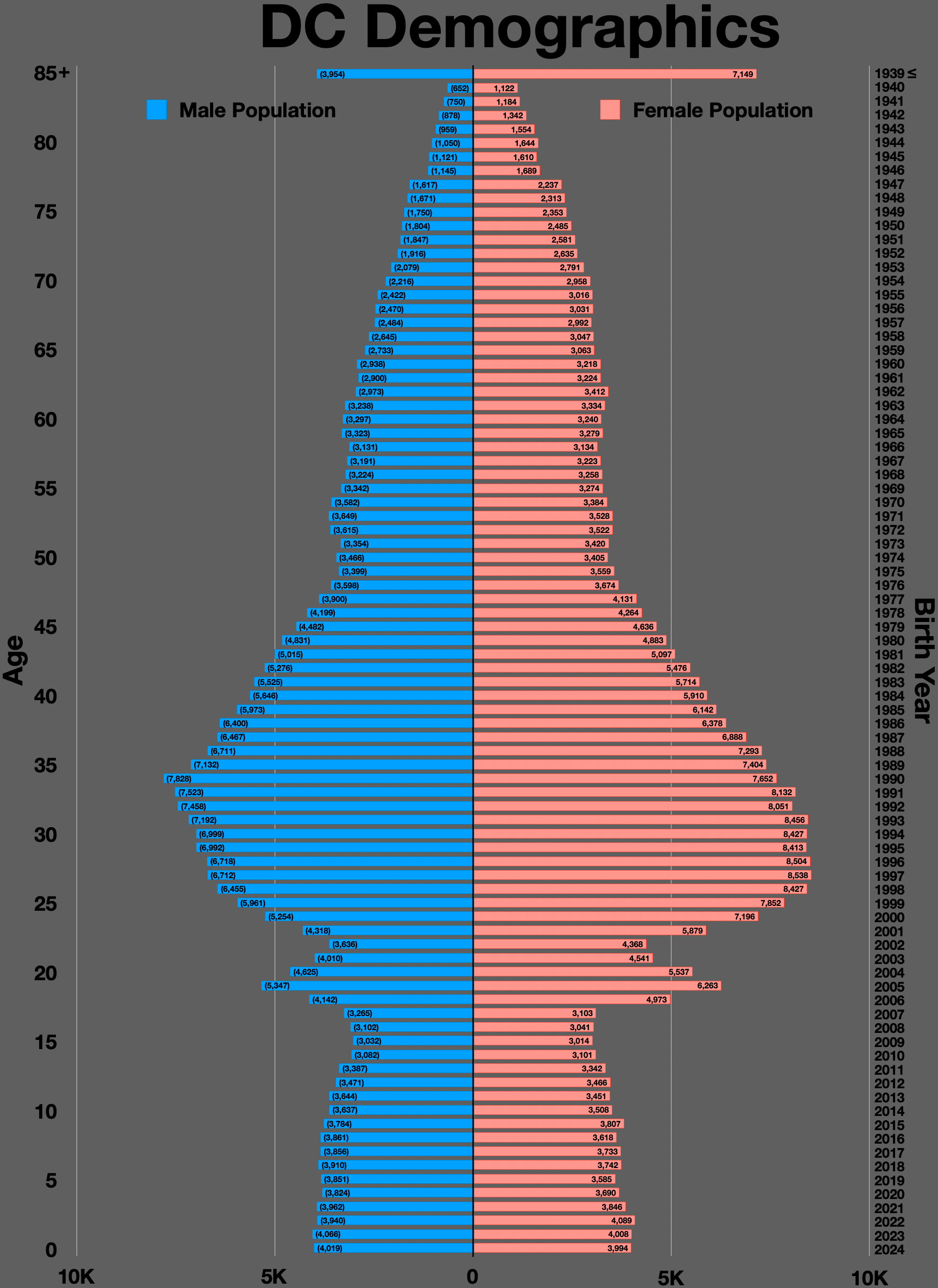
D.C. population pyramid

The District of Columbia is a federal district with an ethnically diverse population. On July 2024, the District had a population of 702,250 people, with a resident density of 11,515 people per square mile.

The District of Columbia had relatively few residents until the Civil War. The presence of the U.S. federal government in Washington has been instrumental in the city's later growth and development. Its role as the capital leads people to forget that approximately one-third of the District of Columbia's population was born in the city.

In 2011, the District of Columbia's Black population slipped below 50 percent for the first time in over 50 years. The District was a majority-Black district from the late 1950s through 2011. The District of Columbia has had a significant African-American population since the District's creation; several neighborhoods are noted for their contributions to Black history and culture. Like numerous other border and northern cities in the first half of the 20th century, the District of Columbia received many black migrants from the South in the Great Migration. African Americans moved north for better education and job opportunities, as well as to escape legal segregation and lynchings. During World War II, the growth of the military-industrial complex provided increased economic opportunities for African Americans.

In the postwar era, the percentage of African Americans in the District steadily increased as its total population declined as a result of suburbanization, supported by federal highway construction, and white flight. The Black population included a strong middle and upper class.

Since the 2000 U.S. census, the District has added more than 120,000 residents and reversed some of the population losses seen in previous decades. The growth is speeding up; the population has increased more than 100,000 since the 2010 census. The proportion of White, Asian, and Hispanic residents has increased, and the proportion of Black residents has stagnated, with the latter mostly moving to the suburbs.

Between 2010 and the 2020 census, the Black population experienced a notable decline, with Blacks comprising fewer than half of the population for the first time since the late-1950s, though still the largest racial group in the city. The percentage of Asians, Hispanics and whites all experienced small increases.

== History ==
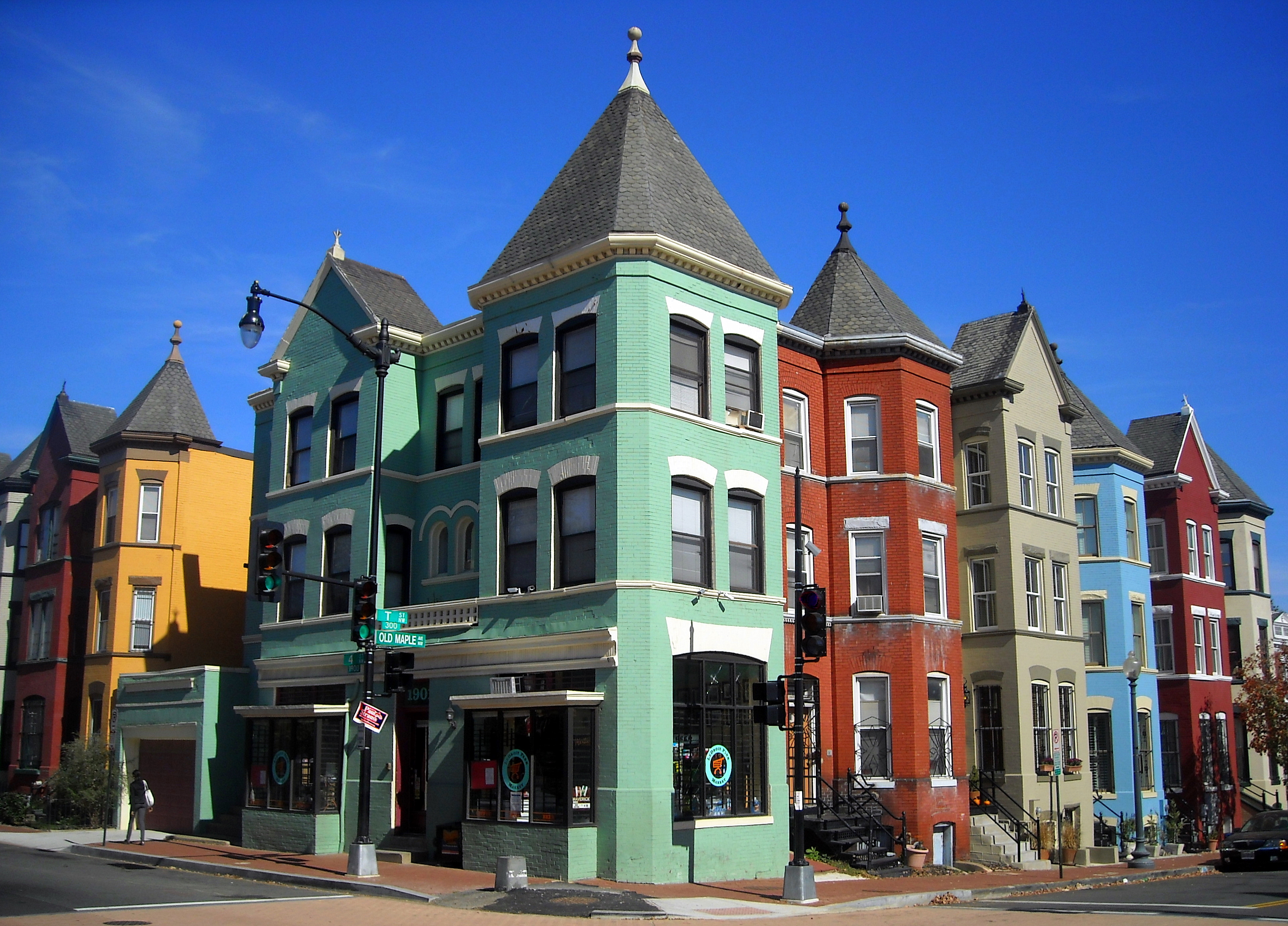
LeDroit Park, a neighborhood listed on the National Register of Historic Places

The District of Columbia was established to host the new United States capital, the City of Washington. However, there were already many settlements within the federal territory when it was created in 1790. Most important of these settlements were the cities of Georgetown, founded in 1751, and Alexandria, Virginia (then included in the District), founded in 1749. Together these two cities had most of the District's early residents. The populations of each place were counted separately from that of the City of Washington until Alexandria was returned to Virginia in 1846, and until the District of Columbia was formed into a single entity in 1871. In 1790, Alexandria had a population of 2,748. By 1800, the City of Washington had a population of 3,210, Georgetown had 2,993, and Alexandria had 4,971.

The District's population remained small in comparison to other major U.S. cities. In 1860, directly before the Civil War, the District had about 75,000 residents, far smaller than such major historical port cities as New York at 800,000 or Philadelphia at more than 500,000. It is notable that the District of Columbia had a large African-American population even before the Civil War, and most were free people of color, not slaves. Due to slaveholders' manumission of slaves in the Upper South after the American Revolutionary War, the free Black population in those states climbed markedly from an estimated 1% before the war to 10% by 1810. Since many states did not permit free Blacks to stay after gaining freedom, they often relocated to the District; in 1860, about 80% of the District's African-American residents were free Blacks.

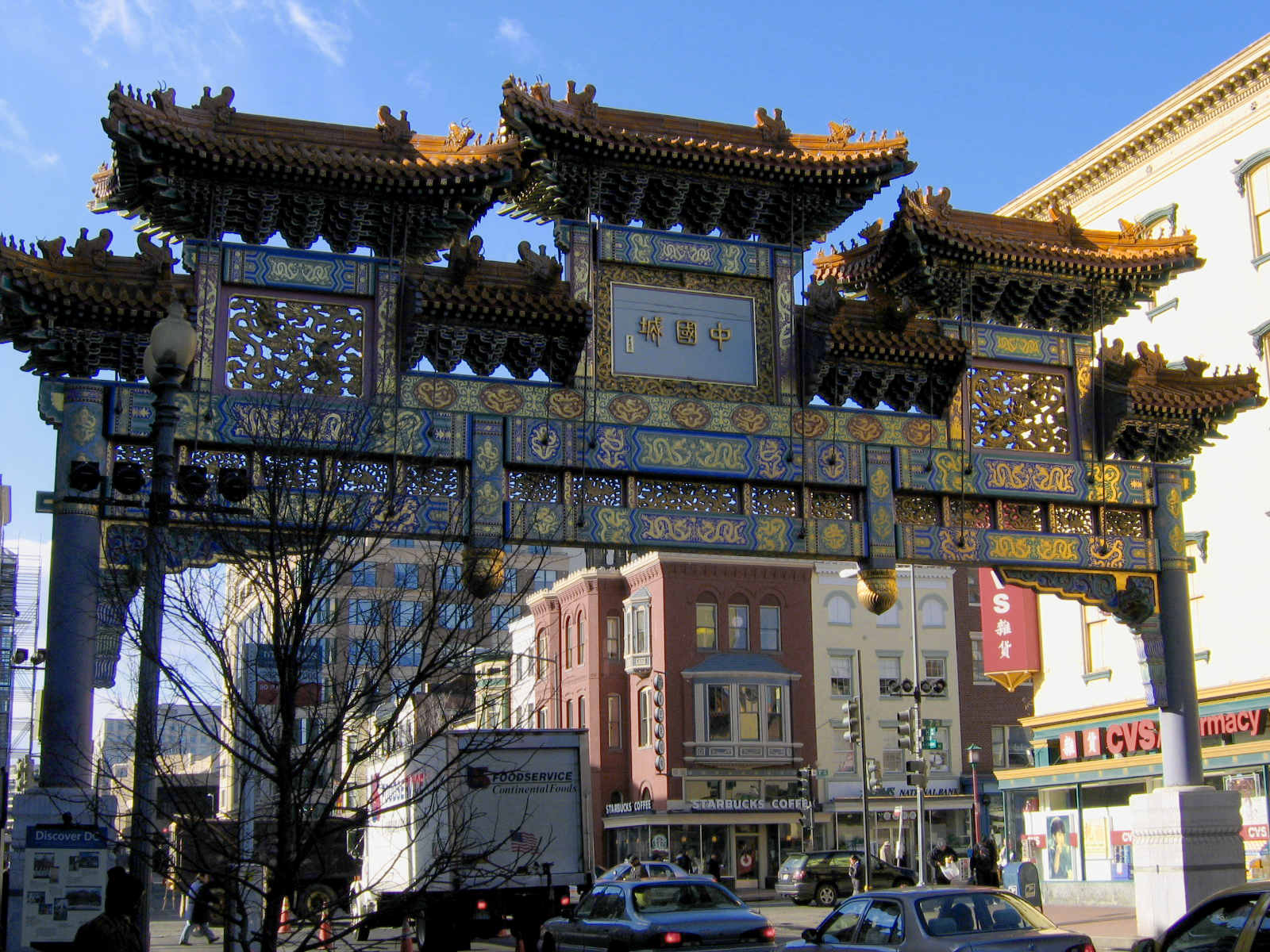
The "Friendship Arch" is at the center of Chinatown.

Following the Civil War, the District's population jumped 75% to more than 130,000. The District of Columbia's population continued to grow throughout the late nineteenth century as Irish-American, German-American, and Jewish-American immigrant communities formed in downtown areas. Many immigrants escaping severe poverty and antisemitism moved to the US and found refuge in the District. By 1900, the District's growth had spread to the more residential sections beyond the old Florida Avenue boundary line following the development of the District's streetcar lines along major arteries such as Pennsylvania Avenue, SE, Connecticut Avenue, Wisconsin Avenue, Georgia Avenue, 14th Street, and 16th Street. By 1930, development within the District's boundaries was largely complete, except for a few outlying areas in far Northeast and Southeast. The District's population totaled just under 500,000. In response to the Great Depression in the 1930s, President Franklin D. Roosevelt's New Deal legislation expanded the bureaucracy in the District of Columbia. World War II further increased government activity and defense contracting, adding to the number of federal employees in the capital. People came from across the country to work in wartime in the District of Columbia. By 1950, the District's population reached a peak of 802,178 residents.

Shortly after that, in a pattern repeated across the country, the District began losing residents attracted to newer housing in the suburbs, with commutes made easier by an expanded highway network outside the District. Following social unrest and riots in the 1960s, plus increasing crime, by 1980, the District of Columbia had lost one-quarter of its population. After the achievements of civil rights, more of the District's middle-class Black population also moved to the suburbs. The District's population continued to decline until the late 1990s. Gentrification efforts started to transform the demographics of distressed neighborhoods. Recently, a trend of growth since the 2000 U.S. Census provided the first rise in the District's population in 50 years.

== Statistics ==
=== 2020 census ===
Racial plurality by ward

Race by ward in DC, per the 2010 US Census

Race by ward in DC, per the 2020 ACS. Overall the city has become more White and less Black since 2010.
Legend
- Non-Hispanic White
  40–50%
  50–60%
  60–70%
  70–80%
  Black or African American
  40–50%
  50–60%
  60–70%
  70–80%
  80–90%
  90%+

Washington city, District of Columbia – racial and ethnic composition Note: the US Census treats Hispanic/Latino as an ethnic category. This table excludes Latinos from the racial categories and assigns them to a separate category. Hispanics/Latinos may be of any race.
Race / ethnicity (NH = Non-Hispanic)	Pop 1980	Pop 1990	Pop 2000	Pop 2010	Pop 2020	% 1980	% 1990	% 2000	% 2010	% 2020	% change 2010–2020
White alone (NH)	164,244	166,131	159,178	209,464	261,771	25.73%	27.37%	27.83%	34.81%	37.96%	+3.15%
Black or African American alone (NH)	445,154	395,213	340,088	301,053	282,066	69.74%	65.12%	59.45%	50.03%	40.91%	–9.12%
Native American or Alaska Native alone (NH)	1,031	1,252	1,274	1,322	1,277	0.16%	0.21%	0.22%	0.22%	0.19%	–0.03%
Asian alone (NH)	6,636	10,734	15,039	20,818	33,192	1.04%	1.77%	2.63%	3.46%	4.81%	+1.35%
Native Hawaiian or Pacific Islander alone (NH)	x	x	273	216	349	x	x	0.05%	0.04%	0.05%	+0.01%
Other race alone (NH)	3,589	860	1,670	1,451	3,753	0.56%	0.14%	0.29%	0.24%	0.54%	+0.30%
Mixed-race or multiracial (NH)	x	x	9,584	12,650	29,485	x	x	1.68%	2.10%	4.28%	+2.18%
Hispanic or Latino (any race)	17,679	32,710	44,953	54,759	77,652	2.77%	5.39%	7.86%	9.10%	11.26%	+2.16%
Total	638,333	606,900	572,059	601,723	689,545	100.00%	100.00%	100.00%	100.00%	100.00%	n/a

=== Population ===
Per the 2020 Census, the District's population was 689,545 residents, continuing a trend of population growth in the District since the 2000 Census, which recorded 572,059 residents. During the workweek, the number of commuters from the suburbs into the city swells the District's population by an estimated 71.8%, to a daytime population of over one million people. The Washington Metropolitan Area, which includes the surrounding counties in Maryland and Virginia, is the eighth-largest in the United States, with more than five million residents. When combined with Baltimore and its suburbs, the Baltimore-Washington Metropolitan Area has a population exceeding eight million residents, the fourth-largest in the country.

There were 281,475 households within the District in 2017. About 45% of those were householders living alone. There were also 119,357 family households; about 20% of homes had children under 18. Of those families with children, 56% were those headed by a married couple. The average household size was 2.32, and the average family size was 3.40.

== Ethnic composition ==
DC is also home to people of more than 170 nationalities and ethnic groups, making it one of the most diverse cities in the United States.

In 2007, an estimated 74,000 immigrants lived in the District of Columbia. Major sources of immigration have included El Salvador, Ethiopia, Guatemala, China, Jamaica, India, the U.K., the Dominican Republic, and the Philippines. A concentration of Salvadorans have settled in the Mount Pleasant neighborhood. Wards 1 and 4 have the highest percentages of immigrants in the city, and the Brightwood neighborhood in Ward 4 has the highest percentage of immigrants of any neighborhood in D.C., with only 46 percent of residents being born in the United States.

=== African Americans ===
D.C. has long been noted for its large, though declining, African-American population, who form a plurality of the city's population. Black Americans have officially been the District's largest racial group since the 1960 Census. In 1970, 71.1% of the population identified as Black, but in recent years the number of European Americans, Asian Americans, and Latinos in the District has increased. Notable African American neighborhoods include, Shaw, LeDroit Park, Sixteenth Street Heights and Anacostia, among others. In general, African Americans show a strong concentration in areas east of Rock Creek park, notably so in the city's Northeast and Southeast quadrants.

The Black population in D.C. has been declining. Many Black residents in D.C. have moved back to Southern cities such as Atlanta, Dallas, Houston, Birmingham, Memphis, San Antonio and Jackson. In recent decades, as traditional Black neighborhoods are affected by gentrification, many middle-class and professional African Americans have moved to the suburbs, mostly to Maryland (Prince George's County, Charles County, Montgomery County, and to a lesser extent Howard County and Frederick, Maryland) and Northern Virginia, aggravated by the rising cost of living in the area or low-performing public schools. In addition, a minority of African Americans are migrating to parts of the South, notably North Carolina, Texas, Georgia and Florida in a New Great Migration because of family ties, retirement, and lower cost of living. Despite decline in the District, regional Black population growth continues due to robust migration from the Caribbean, Africa, and other parts of the United States. Notable contributory states are New York, New Jersey, Pennsylvania and Michigan.

=== African immigrants ===
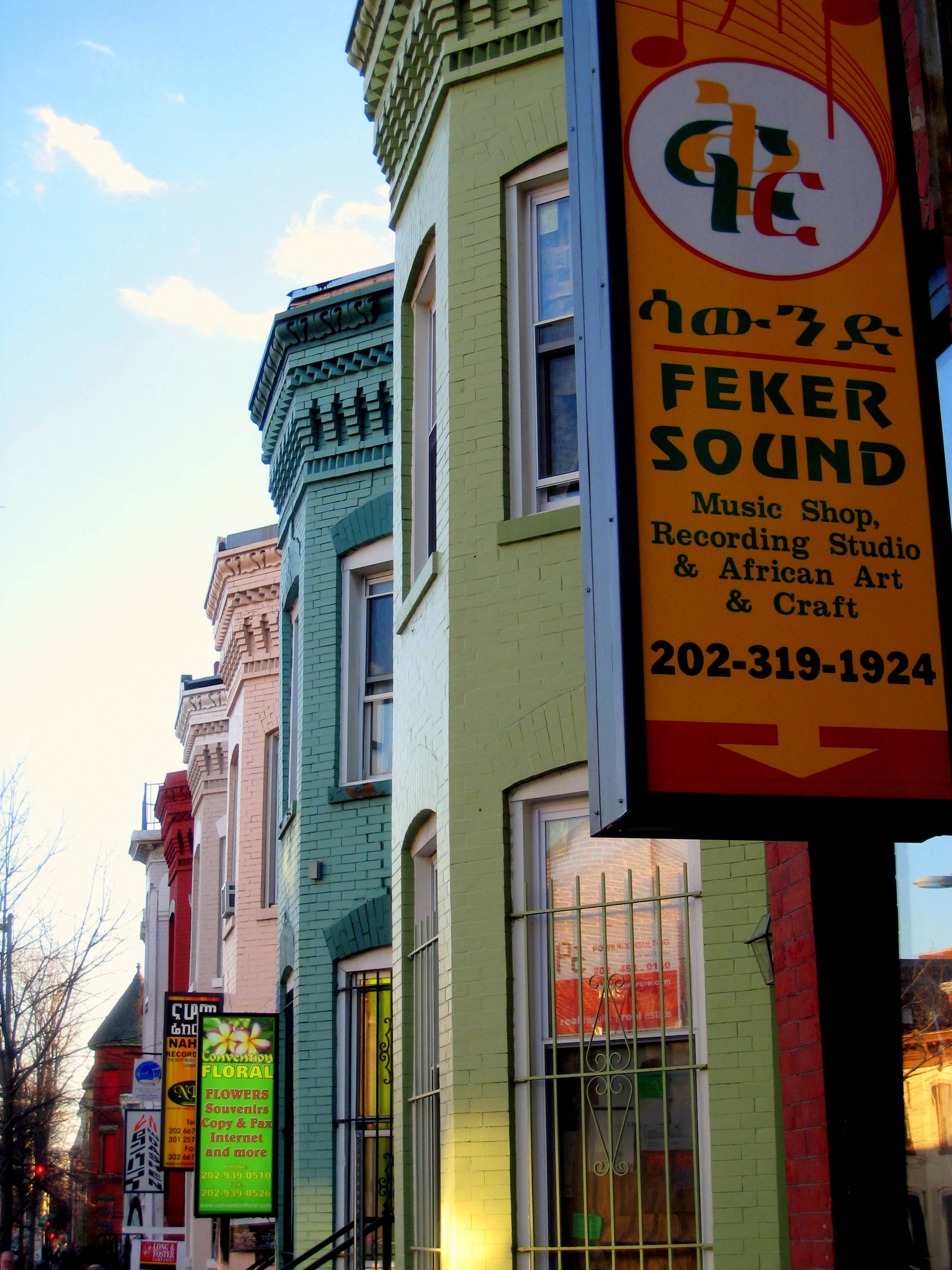
A section of Little Ethiopia in the Shaw neighborhood

The metro DC area is the second-most popular destination for African immigrants, after New York City. More than 192,000 African-born people live in DC and nearby suburbs as of 2019, just shy of the 194,000 African-born in New York. This includes Nigerians with 19,600 residents, and Ghanaians with 18,400. By far, the largest concentration of Ethiopians in the United States are found in D.C. and the local metro area. Some conservative estimates put the number at around 75,000 residents. In contrast, other estimates are as high as 250,000 Ethiopians in DC and surrounding neighborhoods. So heavy is the concentration of Ethiopian restaurants and shops in central Washington, that a part of the Shaw neighborhood is known as "Little Ethiopia". Other notable groups include those from Nigeria, Egypt, Morocco, South Africa, Cameroon and Kenya, who tend to congregate in the region’s suburban areas, in contrast to the Ethiopian and Somali communities, which show a decided urban concentration in areas such as Shaw, the U Street Corridor and Adams Morgan. In general, African migrants display higher education, labor participation and English usage rates than other migrants to the US.

=== Caribbean immigrants ===
The DC area contains Jamaican, Haitian, Trinidadian, Guyanese, and British West Indian populations. According to a study by George Mason University, there are an estimated 83,400 Caribbean born people living in the greater Washington, DC area. The largest numbers are from Jamaica (29,034), Trinidad and Tobago (16,154), the Dominican Republic (13,814), Haiti (8,114), and Cuba (6,599).

Within the District itself there are 8,415 Caribbean born as of 2019, with much larger numbers found in Prince George's County, MD (22,965) and Montgomery County, MD (16,797). The West Indian population is largely concentrated in Petworth, Manor Park, Brightwood Park, Edgewood, Bloomingdale, Shaw, U Street/Cardozo, Adams Morgan, and Brightwood with smaller numbers in the Northeast, Northwest and Southeast quadrants. However, the number of West Indians balloons when considering those of West Indian ancestry, many of whom have mixed with mostly African American or other Hispanic communities, depending upon the time they arrived in the US. The DC area has one of the largest Jamaican and anglophone Caribbean populations in the country, though many West Indians are facing the same effects of gentrification as African Americans, leading to a slow migration to the suburbs, especially to Prince George's County.

Though Jamaicans, Cubans and anglophone Caribbeans represent the majority of West Indians in Washington, there has been a significant growth in the number of Haitians and Dominicans in recent decades, who are more thus more evenly distributed throughout the city and region, and have lower citizenship and education rates than longer settled groups.

=== European immigration ===
While the White population of DC represents 43.6% of the total, part of this grouping includes a number of European-born residents, who range from expats to dual citizens. There are 18,359 foreign-born European DC residents. The largest groups include 2,407 from the United Kingdom, 2,271 from Germany, 2,103 from France, and 899 from Italy. There are also many diaspora groups in DC including from the Irish community, Italian community, and Syrian community. Another significant Caucasian community from the Caucasus region in the District includes Armenian-Americans, with about 8,000 residents estimated in 2003. There are also an estimated 2,700 D.C. residents of Lebanese descent.

Historically, European immigrant neighborhoods in DC have included the Irish neighborhoods of Swampoodle, currently known as NOMA (North of Massachusetts Ave), Brookland, German and Irish in Foggy Bottom and the West End during the latter part of the 19th century and the Italian neighborhood of Judiciary Square, that have since ceased to be primarily populated with residents from these ethnic groups. German-Jewish immigrants settled in the neighborhoods of Cleveland Park and Forest Hills and neighborhoods east of Rock Creek Park such as Petworth, Brightwood, and Crestwood at the beginning of the 20th century. Greek immigrants settled in the downtown area of the District at the end of the 19th and beginning of the 20th centuries and established the parish of Saint Sophia Greek Orthodox Church on 8th and L Streets NW.

=== Hispanics and Latinos ===
Per the 2017 American Community Survey, the Hispanic population in DC is 76,526 (11% of the population). The Hispanic population in the neighboring states of Maryland and Virginia is 742,000; 512,000 live in Virginia (9% of Virginia population) and 230,000 living in Maryland (9.5 of Maryland population). The largest Hispanic groups are Salvadoran (19,674 or 25.7% of District of Columbia's 76,526 Hispanics) and Mexicans (16,912 or 22.1%). In 1976 Walter Washington, Mayor of the District of Columbia, created the Office of Latino Affairs of the District of Columbia. A near majority of DC Hispanics are from Northern Central America and Mexico, with Salvadorans making up the largest group in the city and the metropolitan area as a whole. There are also large numbers of Guatemalans, Hondurans, Dominicans, Puerto Ricans, Bolivians and Colombians.

The city's Caribbean Hispanic population, largely composed of Puerto Ricans and Dominicans, has grown significantly since 2000, increasingly mirroring major cities further north up the East Coast, though Salvadorans remain a plurality of the city's Hispanic residents. There has been a significant in-migration of Puerto Ricans and Dominicans from those respective islands and nearby regions, since the early 2000s, particularly from New York City, New Jersey, Philadelphia and Baltimore, due to the area's strong job market. The city's Puerto Rican population has notably surged since Hurricane Maria struck Puerto Rico, though it remains smaller than nearby Philadelphia and New York City.

In general, Puerto Ricans tend to have higher English language proficiency and interethnic marriage rates, than other Hispanic groups. Indeed, many Caribbean Hispanics also have African ancestry and may choose to identify as African American or Afro-Latino such as Cuban American, D.C. native, Laz Alonso, in contrast to other cities such as Miami. Many Hispanics live in the majority-Hispanic Mount Pleasant neighborhood and nearby Columbia Heights; however, a significant number live in majority-white or Black neighborhoods or immigrant heavy areas such as Brightwood and Takoma. The DC Hispanic/Latino community is very diverse and somewhat scattered in some areas.

=== Asian immigration ===
Asian-American residents make up 3% of the total population of DC. This includes 16,788 foreign-born residents. Traditionally, Chinese immigrants congregated in what is now Penn Quarter, but most Chinese-Americans have relocated to nearby Rockville, Maryland, leaving mostly older residents in what is left of DC's Chinatown. The largest groups include Chinese at 0.9% of the population, followed by Indians at 0.9%, Filipinos at 0.5%, Koreans at 0.4%, and Vietnamese at 0.3%. Other smaller Asian groups include Japanese and Pakistanis.

=== Languages ===
Language spoken at home by those aged 5+ (2021)
1. English (82.6%)
2. Spanish (8.80%)
3. Other Indo-European (4.00%)
4. Asian & P.I. langs. (2.20%)
5. Amharic, Arabic, other African, and others (2.50%)

The language most widely spoken at home in DC by those 5 years and older in 2021 was English (82.6%) followed by Spanish at 8.8%; the District is 11.5% Hispanic, of diverse origins including (as of 2019) Salvadoran (2.8%) Dominican (1.3%), Mexican (1.3%), and Puerto Rican (1.2%).

4.0% speak other Indo-European languages at home including French (1.5%), Italian (0.3%), Russian (0.3%), Persian (0.2%), and Hindi (0.2%).

2.2% speak an Asian or Pacific Island language at home including Chinese (0.8%), Tagalog (0.3%), Korean (0.2%), Japanese (0.1%), and Vietnamese (0.1%).

2.5% speak a language of another origin at home including Amharic (1.2%), West African languages (0.4%), Arabic (0.3%), and Bantu languages (0.1%).

==== Births data ====
Note: Births in table do not correlate as Hispanics are counted both by their ethnicity and by their race, giving a higher overall number.

Live births by single race/ethnicity of mother
Race	2014	2015	2016	2017	2018	2019	2020	2021	2022	2023	2024
Black	5,026 (52.9%)	5,002 (52.2%)	4,804 (48.7%)	4,573 (47.8%)	4,252 (46.2%)	4,131 (45.5%)	3,992 (45.0%)	3,591 (41.5%)	3,495 (43.3%)	3,362 (42.6%)	3,188 (41.8%)
White	2,966 (31.2%)	2,976 (31.1%)	3,071 (31.2%)	3,042 (31.8%)	3,040 (33.0%)	2,985 (32.9%)	2,947 (33.2%)	2,959 (34.2%)	2,602 (32.2%)	2,570 (32.5%)	2,415 (31.7%)
Asian	482 (5.1%)	499 (5.2%)	436 (4.4%)	396 (4.1%)	444 (4.8%)	392 (4.3%)	393 (4.4%)	402 (4.6%)	393 (4.9%)	347 (4.4%)	373 (4.9%)
Hispanic (any race)	1,282 (13.5%)	1,327 (13.9%)	1,348 (13.7%)	1,336 (14.0%)	1,296 (14.1%)	1,354 (14.9%)	1,349 (15.2%)	1,341 (15.5%)	1,348 (16.7%)	1,413 (17.9%)	1,399 (18.4%)
Total	9,509 (100%)	9,578 (100%)	9,858 (100%)	9,560 (100%)	9,212 (100%)	9,079 (100%)	8,874 (100%)	8,660 (100%)	8,075 (100%)	7,896 (100%)	7,616 (100%)

- Since 2016, data for births of White Hispanic origin are not collected, but included in one Hispanic group; persons of Hispanic origin may be of any race.

=== Literacy rate ===
A 2007 report found that about one-third of the District of Columbia residents are functionally illiterate, compared to a national rate of about one in five. This is attributed in part to immigrants who are not proficient in English. A 2005 study showed that 85.16% of the District of Columbia residents age five and older speak only English at home and 8.78% speak Spanish. French is the third-most-spoken language at 1.35%.

In contrast to the high rate of functional illiteracy, nearly 46% of D.C. residents 25 and older have at least a four-year college degree, and 25% have a graduate or professional degree. In 2006, the District of Columbia residents had a median family income of $58,526. This has not changed much during the past five years.

=== LGBT+ population ===
A 2012 Gallup Daily tracking poll found 10% of the residents in the District of Columbia were most likely to identify as LGBT+, the highest in the nation.

A 2005 Williams Institute on Sexual Orientation and Gender Identity Law and Public Policy study estimated that 8.1% of the population of DC identified as LGB, the highest in the United States.

The 2000 census revealed that an estimated 33,000 adults in the District of Columbia identify as gay, lesbian, or bisexual, about 8.1% of the District's adult population.

== Religious affiliation ==
Pew Research Center 2014 Religious Landscape Study on religion in the District of Columbia
Affiliation	% of the District of Columbia adult population
	100
Christian	65
Historically Black Protestant	23
Catholic	20
Mainline Protestant	10
Evangelical Protestant	8
Mormon	2
Church of Jesus Christ of Latter-day Saints	1
Other Mormon	1
Orthodox Christian	1
Greek Orthodox	1
Unaffiliated/Religious "Nones"	25
Agnostic	6
Atheist	4
Nothing in particular	14
Nothing in particular (religion not important)	9
Nothing in particular (religion important)	6
Non-Christian faiths	9
Jewish	5
Muslim	2
Hindu	1
Other non-Christian faiths	1
Don't know	1

The Pew Research Center 2014 Religious Landscape Study found that between 17% and 25% of the adult population of the District of Columbia are non-theistic.

Rather than surveying individuals, the Association of Statisticians of American Religious Bodies surveys congregations as to their adherents. According to data from 2010, just under 50% of District of Columbia residents adhered to a Christian congregation (49.9%). Of all DC residents, 12.6% adhere to the Catholic Church, 6.2% to American Baptist, 4.4% to Southern Baptist, 3.1% to Episcopal, 2.2% to Eastern or Oriental, and 1.8% to Methodist. Problematically, the "2010 reports contain incomplete counts of congregations and adherents belonging to the eight largest historically African-American denominations"; the ASARB data records 8.3% of residents adhering to a historically African-American denomination. However, as the population of the District of Columbia was 50.7% African-American in 2010, there may be a significant data gap. Residents who follow Judaism composed 2.9% of the population, while those who practice Islam made up .6%. As survey respondents are congregations, the survey excludes the unchurched, atheists, and agnostics, as well as those who consider themselves religious but do not adhere.

== Historic racial and ethnic makeup ==
Ethnic makeup of the District of Columbia
Year	White (includes White Hispanics)	Non-Hispanic White	Black	Asian	Native; Americans	Other	Multiracial	Hispanic or Latino (any race)
1800	69.6%	-	30.4%	-	-	-	-	-
1810	66.9%	-	33.1%	-	-	-	-	-
1820	68.8%	-	31.2%	-	-	-	-	-
1830	69.9%	-	30.1%	-	-	-	-	-
1840	70.9%	-	29.1%	-	-	-	-	-
1850	73.4%	-	26.6%	-	-	-	-	-
1860	80.9%	-	19.1%	-	-	-	-	-
1870	67.0%	-	33.0%	-	-	-	-	-
1880	66.4%	-	33.6%	-	-	-	-	-
1890	67.1%	-	32.8%	-	-	-	-	-
1900	68.7%	-	31.1%	0.2%	-	-	-	-
1910	71.3%	-	28.5%	0.1%	-	-	-	-
1920	74.7%	-	25.1%	0.2%	-	-	-	-
1930	72.7%	-	27.1%	0.2%	-	-	-	-
1940	71.5%	71.4%	28.2%	0.2%	-	-	-	0.1%
1950	64.6%	-	35.0%	0.4%	-	-	-	-
1960	45.2%	-	53.9%	0.6%	0.1%	0.2%	-	-
1970	27.7%	26.5%	71.1%	0.7%	0.1%	0.4%	-	2.1%
1980	26.9%	25.7%	70.3%	1.0%	0.2%	1.6%	-	2.8%
1990	29.6%	27.4%	65.8%	1.8%	0.2%	2.5%	-	5.4%
2000	30.8%	27.8%	60.0%	2.7%	0.4%	3.8%	-	7.9%
2010	40.2%	34.8%	50.7%	3.5%	0.3%	4.1%	-	9.1%
2017	45.1%	36.8%	47.1%	4.3%	0.7%	2.7%	-	11.1%
2019	42.5%	37.3%	45.4%	4.1%	0.3%	4.4%	3.3%	11.3%
2020	39.6%	38.0%	41.4%	4.8%	-	-	-	11.3%

== Historical population ==
A line chart of the population of Washington D.C.

Historical populations^{[b]} ^{[c]}
Year	Population	Change
1800	8,144	–
1810	15,471	90.0%
1820	23,336	50.8%
1830	30,261	69.7%
1840	33,745	11.5%
1850	51,687	53.2%
1860	75,080	45.3%
1870	131,700	75.4%
1880	177,624	34.9%
1890	230,392	29.7%
1900	278,718	21.0%
1910	331,069	18.8%
1920	437,571	32.2%
1930	486,869	11.3%
1940	663,153	36.2%
1950	802,178	21.0%
1960	763,956	−4.8%
1970	756,510	−1.0%
1980	638,333	−15.6%
1990	606,900	−4.9%
2000	572,059	−5.7%
2010	601,723	5.2%
2020	689,545	14.6%
2021 Est.	670,050	−2.9%

Historical population of each D.C. jurisdiction
Year	Total	Washington; City	Georgetown	Washington; County	Alexandria; County^{[a]}
1800	8,144	3,210	2,993	1,941	5,949
1810	15,471	8,208	4,948	2,315	8,552
1820	23,336	13,247	7,360	2,729	9,703
1830	30,261	18,826	8,441	2,994	9,573
1840	33,745	23,364	7,312	3,069	9,967
1850	51,687	40,001	8,366	3,320	—
1860	75,080	61,122	8,733	5,225	—
1870	131,700	109,199	11,384	11,117	—
1880	177,624	147,293	12,578	17,753	—
1890	230,392	188,932	14,040	27,414	—

== See also ==
- Arts and culture of Washington, D.C.
- Miss District of Columbia USA
- Go-go
- Washington, D.C. hardcore
- DMV hip-hop
- Crime in Washington, D.C.

== Notes ==
^[a]Alexandria was returned to the state of Virginia in 1846. See: District of Columbia retrocession
^[b]Data provided by "District of Columbia - Race and Hispanic Origin: 1800 to 1990" (PDF). United States Census Bureau. 2002-09-13. Archived from the original (PDF) on 2008-07-26. Until 1890, the U.S. Census Bureau counted the City of Washington, Georgetown, and unincorporated Washington County as three separate areas. The data provided in this article from before 1890 is calculated as if the District of Columbia were a single entity as it is today. To view the population data for each specific area before 1890 see: Gibson, Campbell (June 1998). "Population of the 100 Largest Cities and Other Urban Places in the United States: 1790 to 1990". United States Census Bureau.
^[c] Data provided by "New Vintage 2021 Population Estimates Available for the Nation, States and Puerto Rico". 2021-12-21.
