= Religion in Washington =

Religion in Washington may refer to:

- Religion in Washington (state)
- Religion in Washington, D.C.
