= Carlos Rosario International Public Charter School =

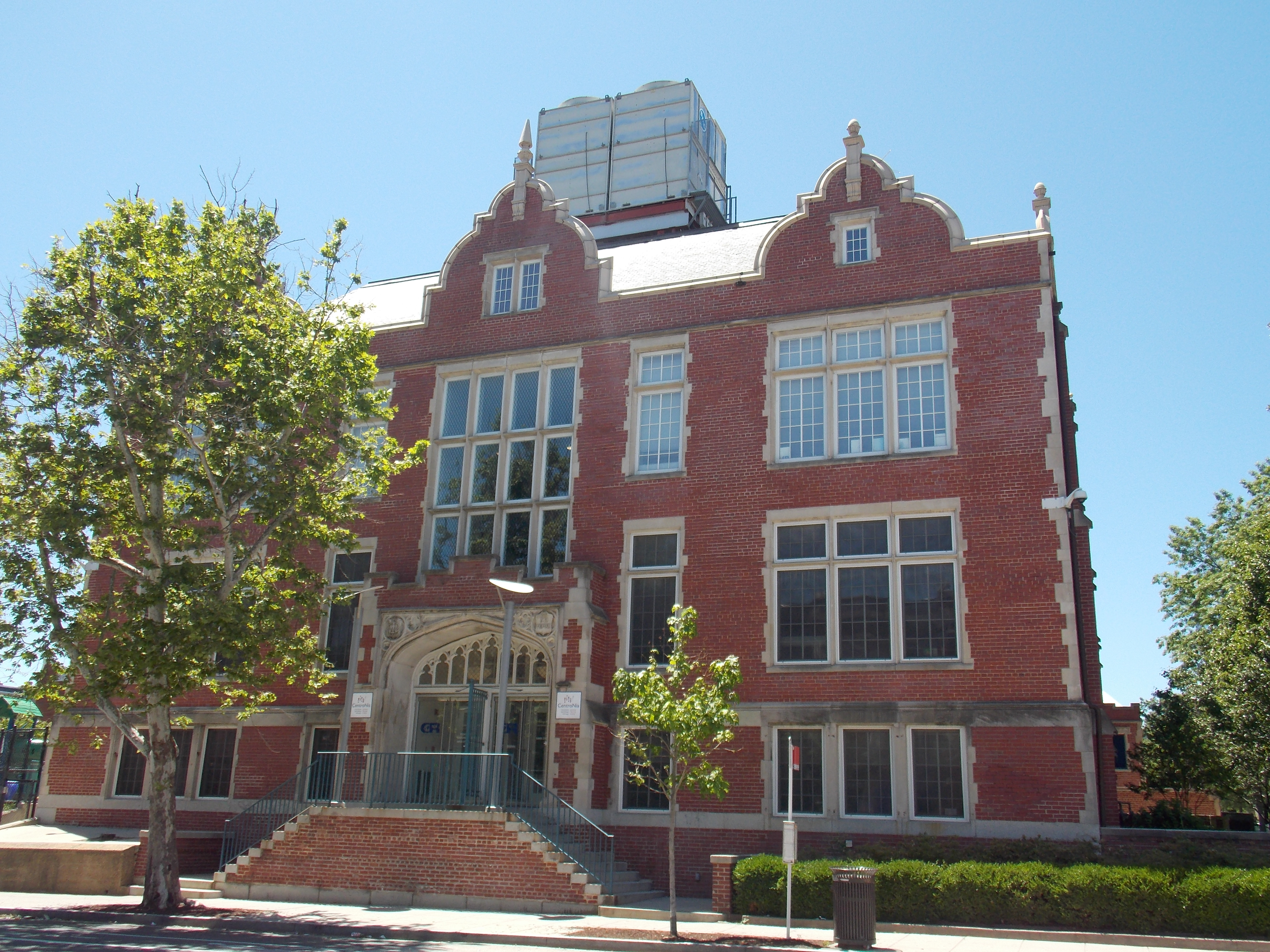
Carlos Rosario International Public Charter School.

Carlos Rosario International Public Charter School is a charter school for adults in Washington D.C.

== History ==
The Carlos Rosario Adult Education Center was started in the 1930s at Gordon Junior High, 35th and T Streets NW in Burleith, Washington, D.C.

Its first program, "Program of English Instruction for Latin Americans," (PEILA) was started by Marcelo Fernandez. In 1972, Sonia Gutierrez was named director of PEILA. In 1978, PEILA was merged with Gordon Junior High and Americanization School forming the Gordon Center.

In 1992, the Gordon Center was renamed to Carlos Rosario Center in memory of Carlos Manuel Rosario. The school functioned until 1996 and had 1,600 students during that year.

In 1996, the District of Columbia closed the Carlos Rosario Center due to a district-wide financial crisis that eliminated all DCPS adult education programs. Afterwards, Sonia Gutierrez raised $150,000 while working from her basement to reopen the center as a private, non-profit school. In 1997, the Carlos Rosario International Career Center opened as a non-profit organization under Sonia Gutierrez's leadership. It was located at the Calvary Baptist Church in Chinatown.

In 1998, Gutierrez won approval from the District of Columbia Public Charter School Board to establish the Carlos Rosario International Public Charter School. It was the first adult charter school in the United States.

In 2004 Carlos Rosario opened a new building at 1100 Harvard Street, Columbia Heights, NW. In 2006 Carlos Rosario Career Center and Carlos Rosario Charter School merged to become Carlos Rosario International Public Charter School.

The school continued to grow and expand under Gutierrez's leadership. In 2013, the Carlos Rosario International Public Charter School opened the Sonia Gutierrez Campus, a workforce development satellite site located in Eckington, Washington, D.C., a neighborhood in the northeast of Washington, D.C., to serve an additional 500 people.

With the opening of this second campus, the school provides services to more than 2,500 students. Its support services and courses include English as a Second Language, GED in Spanish and English, technology essentials, citizenship and career training.

== Campus ==
- James Ormond Wilson Normal School
- U.S. National Register of Historic Places
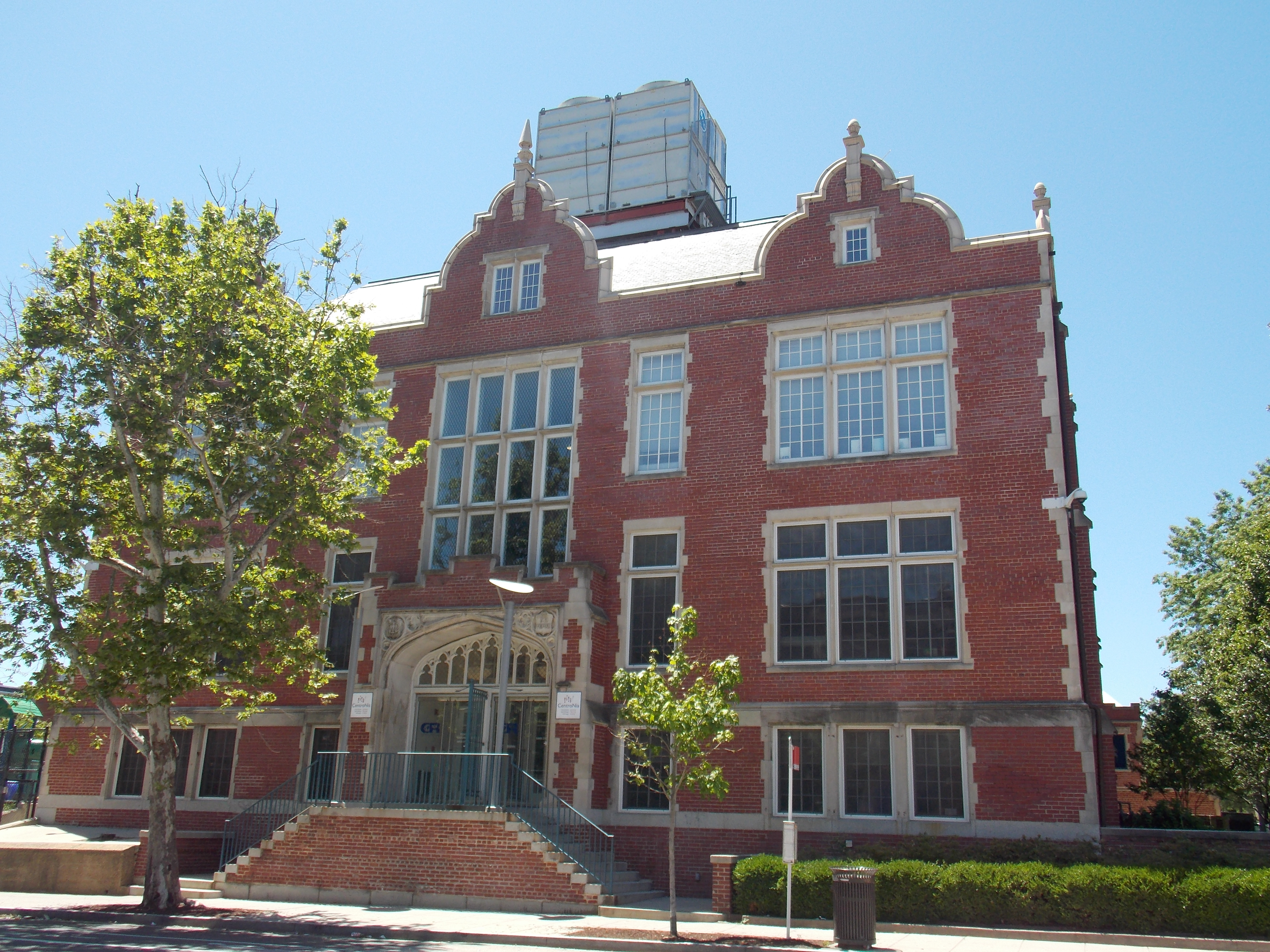
- Harvard Street campus, formerly the James Ormond Wilson Normal School

- Location within Washington, D.C. Location within the United States
- Location: 1100 Harvard Street, NW; Washington, D.C.
- Coordinates: 38.9265°N 77.0277°W
- Built: 1912
- Architect: Snowden Ashford
- Architectural style: Elizabethan Revival
- NRHP reference No.: 15000115
- Added to NRHP: March 31, 2015

The school has two main campuses:

- Harvard Street Campus, located at 1100 Harvard St NW, Washington, D.C.
- Sonia Gutierrez Campus, located at 514 V St NE, D.C.

== Curriculum ==
=== Career training academies ===
The career training options include:

- Culinary Arts Academy: Culinary Arts Fundamentals, International Cuisines and Baking and Pastry.
- Health Academy: Nurse Aide Training for English Language Learners and Nurse Aide Training.
- Technology Academy: IT Fundamentals and Computer Support Specialist Career Training.

=== English classes ===
- English as a Second Language (ESL)
- ESL for Families

=== Other classes and programs ===
- Citizenship Test Preparation
- GED Program
- Math for Life and Work

== Student life ==
More than 2,500 students attend Carlos Rosario and about 350 students graduate from Carlos Rosario each year. The school has many extracurricular activities and volunteer opportunities.

=== Multilingual education ===
The school has a multilingual team providing services to speakers of Amharic, French, Spanish and Vietnamese. The school helps the students address their language barriers, while living in the U.S.

== Extracurricular activities ==
Some extracurricular activities at the school include:

- Math club
- Latin group
- Zumba dance group
- Legal clinics
- Remedial computer instruction

== Notable alumni ==
Some notable alumni include:

- Daniela Moreira, Argentine-American chef and restaurateur
- Geovanny Vicente, political strategist and CNN columnist who is a teacher at CR School and associate professor for Columbia University.

== Awards ==
- It was awarded "one of the best 10 charter schools in Washington D.C." by the mayor of D.C. in 2005
- It received the Gold Star Award for its 100% compliance with all applicable D.C. codes and regulations and Charter School Board regulations in 2009.
- The school won the E Pluribus Unum Award from the Migration Policy Institute.

== See also ==
- Hispanics and Latinos in Washington, D.C.
- La Clínica del Pueblo
- District of Columbia Public Schools
