= Sonia Gutierrez =

Puerto Rican educator and Hispanic rights activist

- Born: July 8, 1939 (age 87); Santurce, Puerto Rico
- Occupations: President Emeritus, Carlos Rosario International Public Charter School in Washington, DC

Sonia Gutierrez (born July 8, 1939) is a Puerto Rican educator and Hispanic rights activist. She was principal, counselor and advocate for adult students at the Carlos Rosario International Public Charter School, an adult charter school in Washington, D.C.

== Early life and education ==
Sonia Gutierrez was born in Santurce, San Juan, Puerto Rico. She earned a bachelor's degree in Business Management and Finance from the University of Puerto Rico in 1961 and earned a master's degree in Adult Education Management from the University of the District of Columbia in 1978.

== Career ==
Gutierrez began her literacy career in the District of Columbia in May 1972 as a counselor of the Program for English Instruction to Latin Americans (PEILA). In October 1972, Gutierrez was named Director of PEILA by founder Carlos Manuel Rosario.

In 1978, Gutierrez facilitated PEILA's merger with the District of Columbia's Americanization Program, resulting in a District of Columbia public school known as the Gordon Adult Education Center. In 1988, under Gutierrez's direction, the Gordon Adult Education Center was named a National Finalist for the U.S. Department of Education's Secretary's Award for Outstanding Adult Basic Education Programs. In 1992, Gutierrez requested that the city council rename the school to the Carlos Rosario Adult Education Center, in memory of PEILA's founder.

=== The Carlos Rosario International Public Charter School ===
In 1996, the District of Columbia closed the Carlos Rosario Center due to a District-wide financial crisis that eliminated all DCPS adult education programs. Gutierrez raised enough money to open a small, private nonprofit program in Calvary Baptist Church in Chinatown. In 1997, the Carlos Rosario International Career Center opened as a nonprofit organization under Sonia Gutierrez's leadership. In 1998, Gutierrez won approval from the District of Columbia Public Charter School Board to establish the Carlos Rosario International Public Charter School The school continued to grow and expand under Gutierrez's leadership. In 2013, the Carlos Rosario International Public Charter School opened the Sonia Gutierrez Campus, a workforce development satellite site serving an additional 500 students located in the Eckington, Washington, D.C. neighborhood of Northeast Washington, D.C. The school won the E Pluribus Unum Award from the Migration Policy Institute. With the opening of this second campus, the school now provides more than 2,500 students annually with comprehensive support services and courses including English as a Second Language, GED in Spanish and English, technology essentials, citizenship and career training. (Note: Details of school accountability can be found on the District of Columbia Public Charter School website.)

Gutierrez has been involved in the social and economic development of the Latino Community in D.C. In 1977, she founded the Council of Latino Agencies. She was instrumental in establishing the Office of Latino Affairs of the District of Columbia and presided over the Latino festival [See: https://fiestadc.org/].

== Personal life ==
She has lived in Washington, D.C. for more than 45 years, and has three children: Jimmy Fairchild and Bobby Fairchild from her first marriage and Michelle Gutierrez from her second marriage to Latino activist Jose Gutierrez. She also has five grandchildren.

== Honors and awards ==
- 2020 Inducted into the Washington D.C. Hall of Fame Society "for her outstanding contributions in the field of Education"
- 2015 CHCI Medallion of Excellence Recipient
- 2013 Administrator of the Year Award — Commission on Adult Basic Education (COABE)
- 2012 Grand Marshall — Fiesta DC
- 2011 Certificate of Special Congressional Recognition, presented by Congresswoman Eleanor Holmes Norton
- 2007 Inducted into the Charter School Hall of Fame
- 2002 Excellence in Education Award — DC Government
- 1999 Literacy Charles E. Scripps Award (National Journalism Awards)
- 1998 Educator of the Year Award — Washington Hispanic Newspaper
- 1994 Inducted to the D.C. Women's Hall of Fame — District of Columbia Commission for Women
- 1987 Washingtonian of the Year Award — Washingtonian
- 1983 Service to the Latino Community Award — Office of Latino Affairs of the District of Columbia
- 1979 Founder Award for Outstanding Dedication — Council of Hispanic Agencies

== See also ==
- Carlos Rosario International Public Charter School
- Carlos Manuel Rosario
- Hispanics and Latinos in Washington, D.C.
