= La Clínica del Pueblo =

Non-profit clinic in Washington, D.C., U.S.

- Formation: 1983
- Purpose: medical services; mental health and substance abuse counseling; language access services; community health action programs
- Locations: Washington, D.C.; Prince George's County, Maryland
- Members: 110 employees (2019)
- Key people: Dr. Juan Romagoza (Director, 1988–2007); Enrique Cobham (Executive Director, 2007–2009); Alicia Wilson (Current Executive Director)
- Website: www.lcdp.org

La Clínica del Pueblo is a non-profit, Federally Qualified Health Center (FQHC) clinic that serves the Latino population of the Washington, D.C., metropolitan area that provides services through medical services, mental health and substance abuse counseling, language access services, and community health action programs.

== History ==
La Clínica del Pueblo (LCDP) was founded in 1983 to address the growing medical needs of Washington's Latino community by Salvadorian activists at the Central American Refugee Center (CARECEN) and "self-proclaimed North American hippies" at Plenty International. Many Salvadorians fled to Washington during the Salvadoran Civil War, seeking refuge, but were unable to access traditional forms of health care due to linguistic and cultural barriers and immigration status. LCDP opened to serve these immigrants, as well as other Latin Americans fleeing war-torn countries, but soon started serving the entire Latino community.

Initially, LCDP provided only basic medical care one day a week, at no cost, staffed by volunteer doctors and health promoters. The start was with Ed Horowtiz as it first employee, who was part-time, and Dr. Peter Shields, who was the volunteer medical director. The clinic rapidly grew due to demand and the hard work of numerous volunteers, developing training programs for lay medical workers (Promoteres de Salud), increasing provision of primary care and start of a mental health program. The clinic was at the forefront at the start of the HIV epidemic and continues with important services for HIV and other infections. LCDP also became a significant institution for Washington's Latino LGBTQ community during the HIV/AIDS epidemic, and later implemented and evaluated a practice-transformation model to improve HIV service delivery for Latino patients. It quickly became a safe place for undocumented refugees to go for care from understanding individuals. As the Latino population grew, so did LCDP. It began to provide many different social services, such as health education and outreach.

=== 1987–1995 ===
In 1987, Dr. Juan Romagoza, himself a refugee from El Salvador, became director of LCDP. Under Romagoza and the continued work of Dr. Peter Shields as medical director, LCDP expanded the scope of its operations to alternative medicine, community health outreach and prevention. In 1989, LCDP received a grant from the DC Mayor's Office of Latino Affairs to start a HIV/AIDS program. In 1990, LCDP received its first multi-year contract from the Roman Catholic Archdiocese of Washington to provide physicals to Vietnamese refugees.

At this time, LCDP was still operating under CARECEN. Due its growth, LCDP's staff and patients lobbied for autonomy and in 1995, LCDP became an independent non-profit organization. Dr. Shields was the first President of the Board of Directors and Dr. Romagoza was the first Executive Director.

=== 1995–present ===
From 1995 to 2003, LCDP grew rapidly, increasing its budget from $800,000 to $4.6 million. During this period, LCDP also began accepting reimbursements from Medicaid, which meant it was no longer a free clinic, but services continued to be provided based on need (including free services). This period also saw the creation of the interpreter services program, a Social Services Department which provided patients with case managers, and the launch of an HIV/AIDS prevention program.

In 2000, LCDP received a large grant from the Substance Abuse and Mental Health Services Administration, which allowed its mental health department to hire full-time therapists for the first time.

In 2007, Romagoza stepped down after 20 years and returned to El Salvador to continue his medical outreach there. Enrique Cobham served as Interim Executive Director until 2009, when Alicia Wilson was appointed as executive director. Wilson, who was development director before her appointment as executive director, started at LCDP in 1999 as a case manager. After her appointment as executive director, she started "¡La Clínica Adelante!", an ambitious agenda to grow LCDP's patient programs as well as its resources.

In 2007, LCDP became a Federally Qualified Health Center and implemented a sliding-scale payment system, which ended its tenure as a "free-clinic". LCDP currently accepts some forms of private insurance, Medicare, Medicaid and DC alliance.

In 2007, LCDP served 7,500 clients with over 55,000 health services.

As of 2019, LCDP has a staff of around 110 employees and is located across five different sites in Washington D.C., and Prince George's County, Maryland.

== Service areas ==
LCDP patient services are divided into four different areas. They are:

- Medical services: provides basic health care.
- Mental health/substance abuse: provides substance abuse help and mental health services
- Community health action: works with communities on HIV prevention and other issues, like transgender rights and youth issues.
- Language Access Services: provides patients, staff and the community at large with interpretation services.

== See also ==
- Hispanics in Washington, D.C.
- Office of Latino Affairs of the District of Columbia
- Central America Resource Center
- Latin American Youth Center
