= Washington Hispanic =

Spanish language newspaper in the Washington DC area

- Founded: 1994
- Language: Spanish
- Headquarters: Silver Spring, Maryland
- Website: washingtonhispanic.com

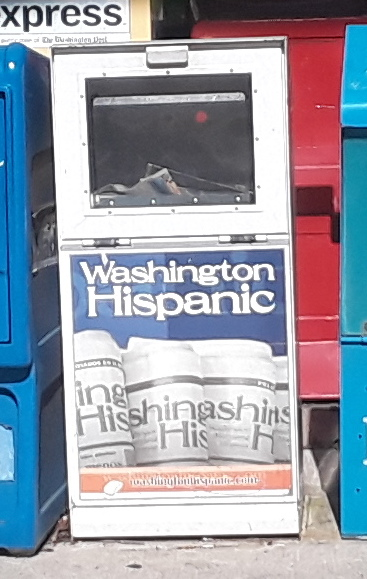
Washington Hispanic dispenser at Huntington metro station

Washington Hispanic is a Spanish-language newspaper in the Washington DC area. The company Washington Hispanic Inc. has its headquarters in Silver Spring, Maryland.

The paper was founded in 1994 by Johnny Yataco. As of 2019 the circulation in the DC area was 45,000.
