= Bell Multicultural High School =

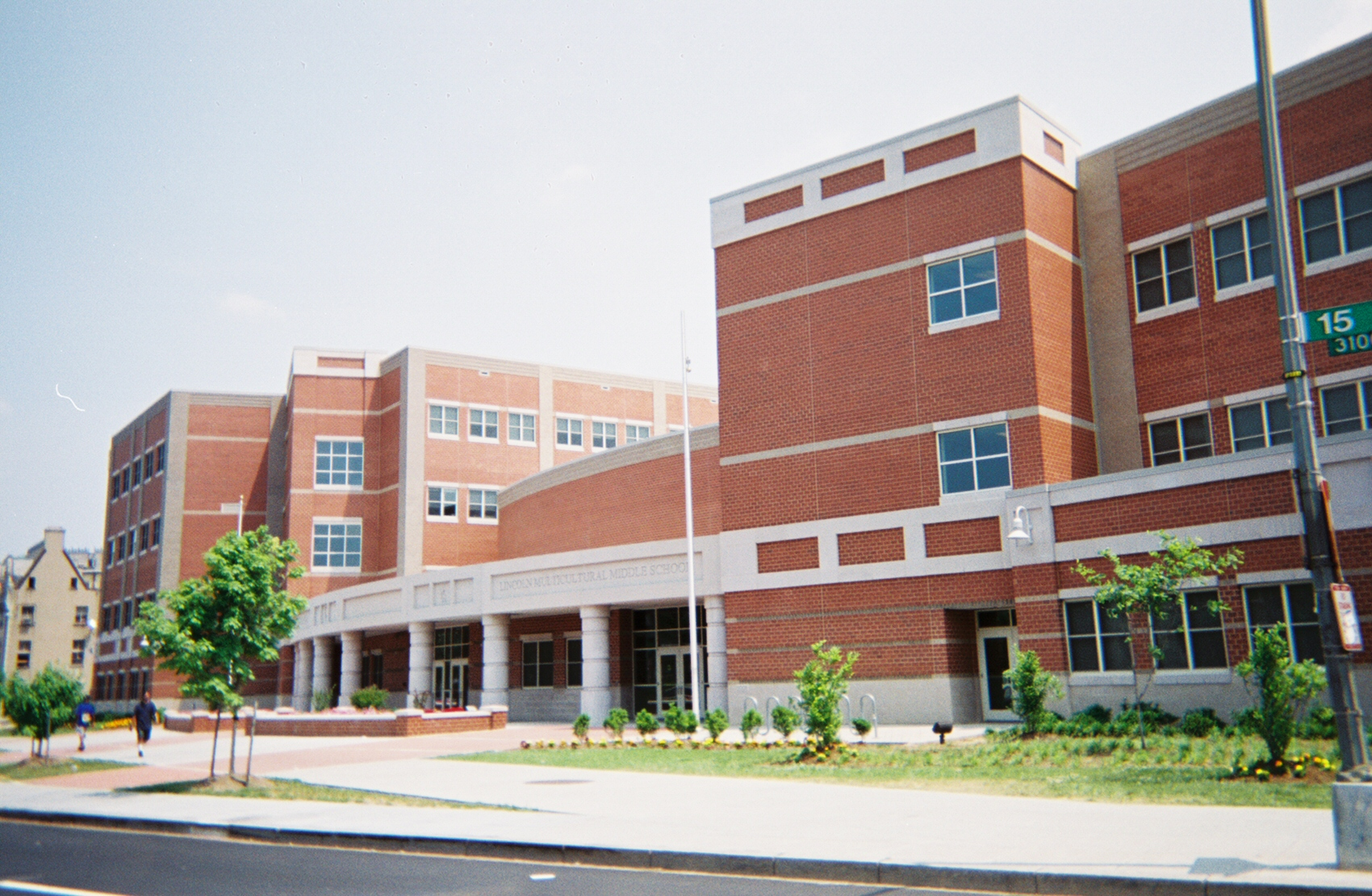

Location
- 3101 16th Str, NW; Washington, DC 20010; United States
- Coordinates: 38°55′45.6″N 77°2′8″W

Information
- CEEB code: 090021
- Principal: Maria Tukeva
- Colors: Blue, gold, white
- Team name: Griffins
- National ranking: 77th (2008, according to Newsweek)
- Website: checdc.org/bell-multicultural-high-school.html

Bell Multicultural High School is a public school located in the neighborhood of Columbia Heights in Washington, D.C., United States. Bell Multicultural is a part of the District of Columbia Public Schools. As of May 2008, the principal is Maria Tukeva.

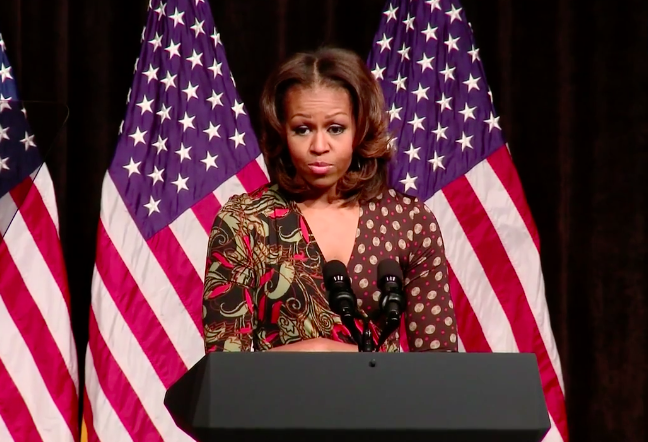
First Lady Michelle Obama giving a speech on higher education at BMHS in 2013.

== History ==
The current Bell Multicultural High School building was built in 2006 to replace the old Bell Multicultural High School.

In 2013, First Lady Michelle Obama visited the school to speak on higher education, telling students, "My story can be your story."

== Academics ==
Students are required to take classes in either Spanish or French with the goal of becoming proficient in that language. All students are required to take two Advanced Placement classes, one in English literature and one in English language. Some students spend part of their school day taking classes at the University of the District of Columbia in pursuit of graduating with both a high school degree and an associate degree.

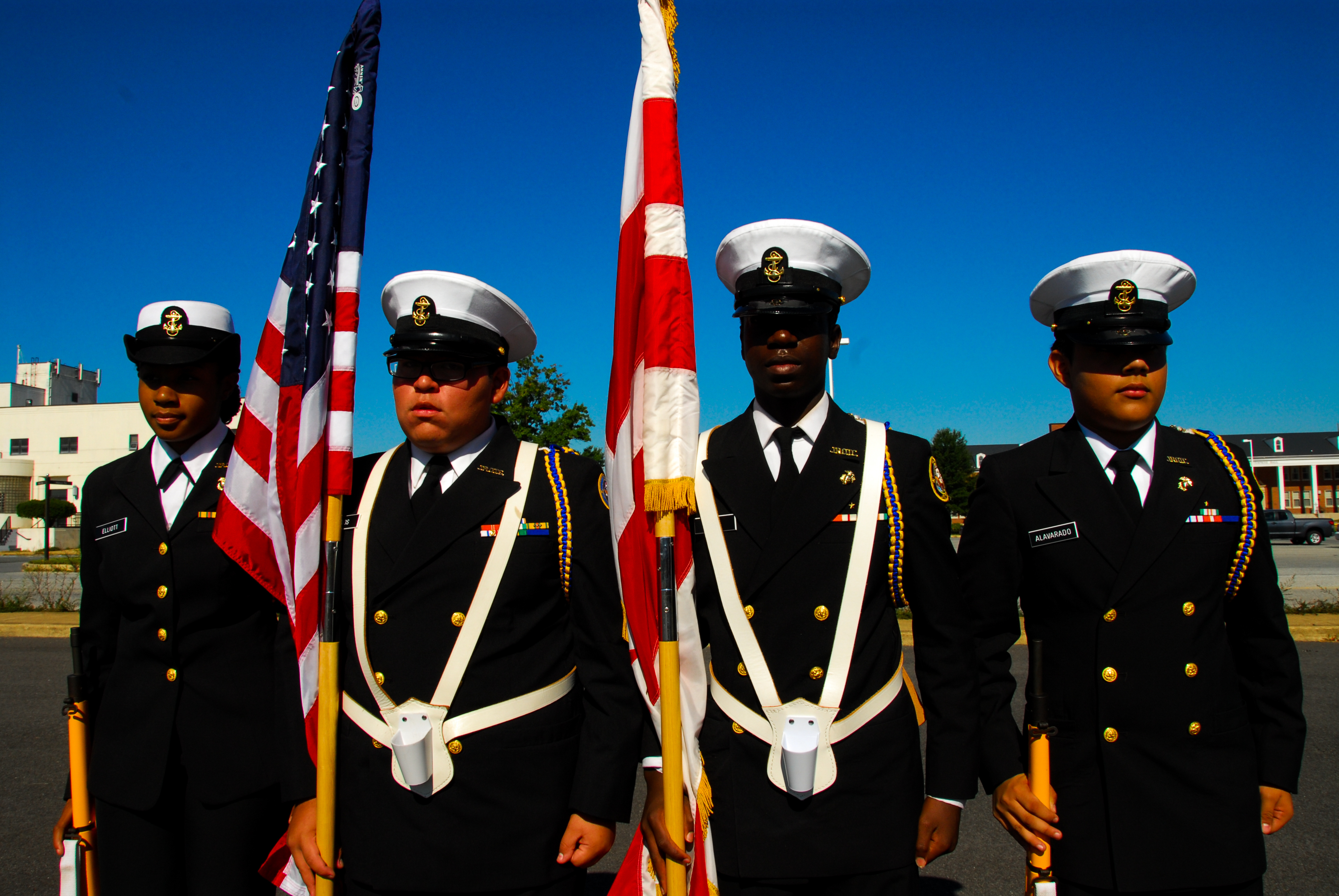
Members of the BMHS Naval Junior Reserve Officers' Training Corps (NJROTC) color guard unit prepare to take the drill deck at the 15th annual NJROTC Drill Competition on Joint Base Anacostia-Bolling.

In 2008, Newsweek ranked Bell Multicultural the 77th best high school in the United States, and 12th in the D.C. metropolitan area. Newsweek ranked schools by the number of Advanced Placement, International Baccalaureate, and/or Cambridge tests taken by all students at a school in 2007 divided by the number of graduating seniors. Bell Multicultural's ratio was 3.888. It was the only District school to rank in the top 100. In the Washington Post's 2007 Challenge Index, Bell Multicultural was ranked 13th in the region and 319th in the nation.

== Extracurriculars ==
Bell Multicultural High School has a Naval Junior Reserve Officer's Training Corps.

== Athletics ==
Bell Multicultural's sports teams are called the Griffins. In 2007, Bell won the D.C. Interscholastic Athletic Association volleyball championship.
