= Office of Latino Affairs of the District of Columbia =

The Office on Latino Affairs of the District of Columbia (OLA) was created by the passage of DC Law 1-86 by the city council on September 29, 1976, and was made part of the Executive office of the Mayor of the District of Columbia. The original bill co-sponsors included city council-members Marion S. Barry, Polly Shackleton, and John A. Wilson

The original draft of the law was crafted by Latino community activist Jose Gutierrez, Sonia Gutierrez, founder of the Carlos Rosario Charter School and Bruce C. French, legislative counsel, D.C. City Council. The legislation has been used as a model by many municipalities across the United States.

The purpose of OLA is to serve the Latino community in D.C. as an intermediary between governmental agencies and the private sector, to improve the quality of life for the Latino population, living in D.C. Some of its duties include addressing social or economic needs with strategic alliances between public and private sector, increasing Latino community participation through training and knowledge dissemination in government procedures and practices, increasing government and Latino community public relationships, and fostering civic compromise.

OLA has helped thousands of Latino individuals and families gain access to governmental and public non-profit services through its advocacy and grants programs.

== Programs ==
The OLA provides funds for community organizations, technical assistance and economic support to NGOs, and programs for improving knowledge and skills which serve Latino residents.

== Budget ==
The OLA is an effort to invest in the more than 800,000 Latino taxpayers living in the Washington, D.C. metropolitan area who live as businesspersons, owners and buyers of houses, workers, and consumers. The OLA budget for 2018 is $3.722 million. These funds are used in many ways, such as giving more than $1 million in grants every year to various causes.

== Latino population ==
There are more than 70,000 Latino residents in D.C. One of every 10 residents of Washington, D.C. is Latino (10%), but there are also thousands more that are considered white Hispanics or Latino descendants. The OLA serves every Latino resident and supports more than 50 communitarian organizations. The OLA also organizes events including job fairs, workshops, and communitarian meetings with major leaders in the D.C area. The OLA also organizes traditional festivals like the Latino Festival, also known as Fiesta D.C. The OLA also strives to provide health, education, employment, and development services.

== See also ==
- Hispanics in Washington, D.C.
- Mayor of the District of Columbia
- Central America Resource Center
- Hispanic and Latino Americans
- Latin American culture
- Arts and culture of Washington, D.C.
- Latin American Youth Center
- GALA Hispanic Theatre
