= Venture Philanthropy Partners =

Venture Philanthropy Partners (VPP) is a philanthropic organization based in the Washington, D.C. metropolitan area. It was founded in 2000 by Mario Morino, Raul Fernandez and Mark Warner to invest in high-performing nonprofits which work to improve the lives and futures of children and youth of low-income families in Washington, D.C., as well as surrounding Northern Virginia, Maryland suburbs, and Prince George’s County.

Since inception, it has invested over $50 million in nonprofits serving over 40,000 children and youth.

VPP provides technical support along with its grants. It makes investments in three areas: Early Childhood, Education, and Youth Transitions.

== History ==
In July 2010, VPP won a five-year, $10 million grant from the federal government’s Social Innovation Fund to create a new collaborative initiative called youthCONNECT initiative, which aimed to help 20,000 at-risk youth in Prince George's County.

By the end of February 2011, six organizations had joined to create the youthCONNECT initiative, including Latin American Youth Center (also known as the Maryland Multicultural Youth Center), Year Up—National Capital Region, College Summit (now known as Peer Forward), Urban Alliance, KIPP DC, and Metro TeenAIDS (now integrated into Whitman-Walker Health).

By 2015, 99 percent of the 12th graders who were supported by the youthCONNECT initiative completed high school, 92 percent applied for college, and 78 percent successfully enrolled in post-secondary education.

In 2015, when the federal grant for youthCONNECT ended, they build upon it a new initiative called Ready for Work, which has since been helping nearly 3,000 students a year prepare for college and careers, in partnership with three high schools: Suitland, Oxon Hill, and High Point. VPP provided the majority of the $15 million funding for the initiative.

== Methodology ==
VPP does not ask for grant applications. It looks for non-profit organizations with growth capacity. VPP focuses on general operation support.

With its first fund, VPP focused on smaller grants for 12 organizations over a period of 9 years. With its second fund, it went to on larger and longer investments in fewer organizations.

=== List of Portfolio I Investments ===
- AALEAD
- Boys and Girls Clubs of Greater Washington
- Center for Multicultural and Humans Services
- CentroNía (Formerly Calvary Multicultural Learning Center)
- Child and Family Network Services
- College Summit, National Capital Region
- Friendship Public Charter School
- Heads Up
- Latin American Youth Center
- Mary's Center for Maternal and Child Care
- See Forever Foundation (which operates the Maya Angelou Public Charter Schools)
- SEED Foundation (which operates the SEED School)

=== List of Portfolio II Investments ===
- KIPP DC (Local DC chapter of the KIPP Foundation)
- Urban Alliance
- Year Up, National Capital Region
- youthCONNECT

=== List of organizations in youthCONNECT ===
- College Summit, National Capital Region
- KIPP DC (Local DC chapter of the KIPP Foundation)
- Latin American Youth Center
- Metro TeenAIDS
- Urban Alliance
- Year Up, National Capital Region
