= XIX International AIDS Conference, 2012 =

The XIX International AIDS Conference was a conference held in Washington, D.C. from 22 to 27 July 2012 at the Walter E. Washington Convention Center, run by the International AIDS Society.

== Theme ==
The theme of the conference is "Turning the Tide Together". The meaning of the theme is that because of recent advances in HIV treatment and prevention and increased evidence that it is possible to scale up interventions, communities have new opportunities to change the historical course of HIV infection.

== Speakers ==
The conference featured many leaders in fields relating to HIV.

Plenary session speakers
Day	Speaker	Country	Role	Talking points
Monday	Anthony S. Fauci	United States	National Institute of Allergy and Infectious Diseases	Public health implementation
Monday	Phill Wilson	United States	Black AIDS Institute	Ending AIDS in the United States
Monday	Sheila Tlou	United Nations	UNAIDS	Accountability for achieving targets
Tuesday	Javier Martinez-Picado	Spain	AIDS Research Institute IrsiCaixa	Eradicating the virus and agenda for a cure
Tuesday	Nelly Mugo	Kenya	University of Nairobi and Kenyatta National Hospital	Implementation science
Tuesday	Bernhard Schwartländer	United Nations	UNAIDS	The costs of necessary policy and societal changes
Wednesday	Barton Haynes	United States	Duke University Human Vaccine Institute	Development of an HIV vaccine
Wednesday	Chewe Luo	United Nations	UNICEF	AIDS and youth
Wednesday	Linda H. Scruggs	United States	Community representative	An agenda for women
Wednesday	Geeta Rao Gupta	United Nations	UNICEF	Changing the AIDS services for women
Thursday	Paul Semugoma	Uganda	Global Forum on MSM and HIV	Men who have sex with men and HIV
Thursday	Cheryl Overs	Australia	Monash University	Public health and harm reduction
Thursday	Debbie McMillan	United States	Transgender Health Empowerment	Drug-using populations
Thursday	Gottfried Hirnschall	United Nations	World Health Organization	Testing and treatment
Friday	Anthony Harries	France	International Union Against Tuberculosis and Lung Disease	Tuberculosis and HIV
Friday	Judith Currier	United States	University of California, Los Angeles	Non-communicable diseases and HIV
Friday	Yogan Pillay	South Africa	South African Department of Health	Integration of HIV services with general health services

== Response of host city ==
The International AIDS Society formally announced that Washington D.C. would host the conference on February 25, 2011. On February 23 Mayor Vincent C. Gray announced the creation of the Mayor's Commission on HIV/AIDS, which is a city board which has the mission to promote treatment and HIV prevention. Gray stated that the conference would bring $22–25 million to the city as delegates stayed in hotels, ate in restaurants, and enjoyed city entertainment.
