= Eloise Giblett =

Genetic scientist

Eloise R. Giblett
- Born: January 17, 1921; Tacoma, Washington, U.S.
- Died: September 16, 2009 (aged 88); Seattle, Washington, U.S.
- Education: University of Washington (BS, MS, MD)
- Known for: Identification of the first immunodeficiency disease
- Scientific career
- Fields: Immunology; Human Genetics
- Workplaces: Puget Sound Blood Center
- Academic advisors: Patrick Mollison; Clement Finch; E. Donnall Thomas

Eloise "Elo" R. Giblett (January 17, 1921 – September 16, 2009) was an American genetic scientist and hematologist who discovered the first recognized immunodeficiency disease, adenosine deaminase deficiency. Giblett was a professor of medicine at the University of Washington in Seattle and executive director of the Puget Sound Blood Center in Seattle. The author of over 200 research papers, she also wrote an esteemed textbook on genetic markers, Genetic Markers in Human Blood, published in 1969. She was elected to the National Academy of Sciences in 1980.

Giblett discovered the first immunodeficiency disease: adenosine deaminase deficiency. She identified and characterized numerous blood group antigens (including the ‘Elo’ antigen, named after her). Her work paved the way for safe red blood cell transfusions. She also applied her understanding of red blood cell protein polymorphisms to genetic linkage analyses, was senior author on the paper that demonstrated the feasibility of unrelated marrow transplantation for leukemia, and was an early supporter of bone marrow donation.

== Early life and education ==
Giblett was born in Tacoma, Washington in 1921. Her family moved to Spokane, Washington for her father's job as an insurance salesman. Giblett received her early education in Spokane and was trained in singing, dancing and the violin. Her Mother, Rose, held a secret desire that Giblett would become the next Shirley Temple of the era.

Giblett graduated from Lewis and Clark High School in 1938. She was only 16 when she earned a scholarship to Mills College in Oakland, California. After two years, she transferred to the University of Washington in Seattle where she earned a degree in bacteriology (now microbiology) in 1942. From 1944 to 1946, she served in the Navy WAVES. Through this program, she worked as a technician at the clinical laboratory of the U.S. Naval Hospital in San Diego, California. In 1947, she returned to the University of Washington to earn her Master of Science in microbiology. Her master's thesis focused on physiology of fungi in the genus Microsporum.

After completing her master's degree, Giblett attended the University of Washington Medical School. One of five women in her year, she graduated first in her class in 1951. From 1951 to 1953, Giblett served as an intern, then resident in Internal Medicine, at King County Hospital (now Harborview Hospital).

== Early career ==
In 1953, Giblett was awarded a two-year fellowship for post-doctoral research in hematology. During this time, Giblett worked under Clement Finch, a renowned hematologist interested in iron metabolism. Giblett primarily assisted with his research on erythrokinetics, the dynamic study of the production and destruction of red blood cells. In her first year working for Finch, Giblett published five papers, including a highly cited paper describing red blood cell lifetime and hemolysis. Giblett also worked with geneticist Arno Motulsky studying erythrokinetics in splenomegaly, kicking off a decades-long collaboration.

After completing her fellowship, Giblett traveled to London to train under Patrick Mollison at the Medical Research Council's Blood Transfusion Research Unit. In this research unit, Giblett gained the laboratory experience necessary to co-direct Puget Sound Blood Center (then King County Blood Bank), a position she assumed upon her return to Seattle in 1955. Giblett remained at the Blood Center as associate director until her promotion to executive director in 1979. She retired in 1987.

== Scientific discoveries ==
Giblett focused the majority of her career on academic research. In 1955, she was appointed Clinical Associate in Medicine at the University of Washington. Giblett's lab focused on studying blood groups, with particular attention to genetic markers in human blood. She identified several blood group antigens. Her research assisted in refuting the standard practice at the time of segregating blood donations based on the race of the donor.

In 1958, Giblett began research studying polymorphisms of the human plasma proteins haptoglobin and transferrin using starch gel electrophoresis. As a result of her studies on genetic variation, Giblett documented the first case of a mosaic individual conceived from dispermic fertilization of two eggs followed by cell fusion.

Giblett actively collaborated with Arno Motulsky, a fellow professor at the University of Washington. Giblett analyzed blood samples from a population study Motulsky carried out in the Congo in 1960. The resulting paper, published in 1966, described many novel genetic variants. Decades later, scientists discovered that one of these samples contained first known case of HIV. The viral sequence from this sample is still used to date in studies of HIV.

Starting in 1971, Giblett began researching bone marrow transplants with E. Donnall Thomas. Bone marrow transplantations were a pioneering technique used to treat blood cancers. At the time, if the donor and acceptor were the same sex, doctors could not confirm the success of the graft. Giblett assisted in discovering genetic markers that could confirm graft success, regardless of donor sex, using polymorphic blood proteins.

Giblett eventually expanded her research into the activity of polymorphic proteins in human plasma and blood cells, leading to her famous discovery of the first immunodeficiency disease. One polymorphic protein used as a routine a genetic marker for transplants was adenosine deaminase (ADA) located in red blood cells. In 1972, Giblett received samples from a patient with severe combined immunodeficiency disease (SCID). The patient was a candidate for bone marrow transplantation from her mother; analysis of blood samples surprisingly revealed that the child exhibited no ADA activity. Giblett soon discovered a second case where ADA deficiency underlaid immune dysfunction, leading her to conclude that the two may be related. Giblett named this disease adenosine deaminase immunodeficiency, and it was recognized as the first official immunodeficiency disease.

The discovery of ADA deficiency lead to a breakthrough in understanding immunodeficiency. Based on the function of ADA in purine metabolism, Giblett hypothesized that mutations in other proteins involved in purine metabolism or related pyrimidine metabolism might underlie additional forms of immune dysfunction. Her hypothesis was confirmed in 1975 upon analysis of an immunocompromised patient exhibiting normal ADA activity but defective purine nucleoside phosphorylase (PNP) activity. Within several years, ten more cases of immune deficiency linked to PNP mutations were described, leading to the classification of the disorder as purine nucleoside phosphorylase deficiency.

Giblett's other notable discoveries include T cell immunodeficiency.

Throughout her career, Giblett collaborated with some of the most notable and talented scientists of her era, including: Oliver Smithies, Alexander Bearn, James Neel, Curt Stern, Victor McKusick, Ernest Beutler, Stanley Gartler, Walter Bodmer, John Cairns, David Weatherall, Henry Kunkel, H. Hugh Fudenberg, and Newton Morton.

== AIDS crisis ==
In 1978, Giblett closed her research lab to direct the Puget Sound Blood Center. Soon after, in 1981, HIV/AIDS was discovered. Infectious disease experts at the time realized that the disorder might be transmissible by blood, creating complications for blood transfusions. This discovery led to a crisis in blood banking. Giblett attempted to allay fears about the hazard of giving blood and closely followed the incidence of the disease in previously transfused patients. Before HIV could be detected in blood, Giblett developed a screening policy for blood donors at the center.

== Retirement ==
Giblett retired from the Puget Sound Blood Center in 1987. She devoted her remaining years to playing the violin and contributing to various musical groups, playing in several string quartets. She was a co-founder of the Music Center of the Northwest, and contributed to them until she died.

== Honors ==
In 1967, Giblett was promoted to full professor at the University of Washington. Giblett served as president of the American Society of Human Genetics in 1973. She was a board member of the American Society of Hematology, the Western Association of Physicians and the New York Blood Center Research Advisory Committee. In 1980, Giblett was elected to the National Academy of Sciences. The following year, she became a fellow of the National Association for the Advancement of Science. In 1987, she was the first woman to receive the University of Washington Medical School Alumni Association's Distinguished Alumni Award. Upon her retirement, she was awarded emeritus status at the University of Washington School of Medicine and Puget Sound Blood Center.

== Legacy ==
In 1969, Giblett published Genetic Markers in Human Blood, a reference book aimed to increase the accessibility of information about biochemical variation in blood. The book was described by H. E. Sutton as "a remarkable achievement for a single individual."

Giblett was a fan of science fiction literature. She is mentioned by name in Robert Heinlein's novel The Number of the Beast.

In 2010, the Elo Giblett Endowed Professorship in Hematology was established at the University of Washington. This professorship was created by combining an amount of money left by Giblett to the university and an additional funding from Giblett's niece, Leslie Giblett. The first recipient of this professorship was John Harlan, MD. This professorship is intended to attract talented medical professionals in hematology and keep Giblett's legacy alive. Elo's unpublished autobiography is property of her niece, Leslie.
