= Barbara Alexander =

Barbara Alexander may refer to:

- Barbara Ehrenreich (1941–2022), née Alexander, American author and political activist
- Barbara Dudley Alexander, American infectious disease physician
- Barbara Niven (born 1953), American actress. also billed as Barbara Lee Alexander
