= Kurtzberg =

Kurtzberg is a surname of German origin. Notable people with the name include:

- Jacob Kurtzberg (better known as Jack Kirby), American comic book artist
  - Zelda Kurtzberg, a Marvel Comics character appearing in early X-Men adventures
  - Goodman, Lieber, Kurtzberg & Holliway, a fictional law firm in Marvel Comics
  - Oberon Kurtzberg (alter ego of Oberon), a DC Comics character associated with Mr. Miracle
- Joanne Kurtzberg, American professor of pediatrics and pathology at Duke University
- Nathaniel Kurtzberg (Caprikid), a character in Miraculous: Tales of Ladybug & Cat Noir
