= Paul Klotman =

American physician-scientist and academic administrator

Paul E. Klotman is an American physician-scientist and academic administrator. He is the president, CEO and executive dean of the Baylor College of Medicine, a position he began on Sept. 1, 2010.

He is the fifth person to serve as president of the College, located in Houston in the Texas Medical Center, which operates as a health sciences university with four schools: Medical School, Graduate School of Biomedical Sciences, School of Health Professions and National School of Tropical Medicine. Klotman joined Baylor at a time when it was experiencing great financial difficulties, and led a successful turnaround.

A nephrologist by training, his research has centered on molecular virology and AIDS pathogenesis. He developed the first small animal model of HIV associated nephropathy using transgenic techniques. Prior to joining Baylor, he served as chair of medicine at Mount Sinai School of Medicine in New York City. He previously held positions on the faculty at Duke University and with the National Institutes of Health, at both the Laboratory of Developmental Biology and the Viral Pathogenesis Laboratory, where he was named chief in 1993.

At Baylor, he oversees the four schools and the college’s research and clinical efforts. Baylor is ranked 20th in the nation in NIH funding. In January 2014, it was announced that Baylor and Catholic Health Initiatives St. Luke’s Health would enter into a joint venture on Baylor St. Luke’s Medical Center, including the existing campus (the former St. Luke’s Episcopal Hospital) and a new medical center being completed on the College’s McNair Campus.

== Early life and education ==
Klotman received his B.S. degree in 1972 from the University of Michigan and his M.D. from Indiana University in 1976. He completed his medicine and nephrology training at Duke University Medical Center.

== Career ==
In 1986, Klotman was an assistant professor of medicine in the division of nephrology at Duke University School of Medicine and the Veterans Administration Medical Center. He was also director of the Duke University hypertension center.

He stayed at Duke as a faculty member, rising to the rank of associate professor of medicine before moving to the NIH in 1988 where he became chief of the Molecular Medicine Section in the Laboratory of Developmental Biology. In 1993, he became chief of the Viral Pathogenesis Laboratory in the NIDR/NIH.

In 1994, he moved to Mount Sinai School of Medicine as the Irene and Dr. Arthur M. Fishberg Professor of Medicine and the chief of the Division of Nephrology. In 2001, he was selected to be the chair of the Samuel Bronfman Department of Medicine of the Mount Sinai School of Medicine.

Dr. Klotman was the last resident to round with the legendary academic physician Eugene Stead when he was the resident on Osler ward at Duke in 1978. He also was one of the few people to ever win a nickel bet with Dr. Stead, something that only happened if the resident knew something Dr. Stead did not. Dr. Klotman served as the Chief Resident in Medicine under Dr. James Wyngaarden, then Chair of Medicine and a past Director of the NIH.

COVID-19 Klotman played a central role, with other Texas Medical Center leaders, during the COVID pandemic, advising local officials, business groups, and school officials. He was a key voice in closing down the annual Houston Livestock Show and Rodeo in 2020, which was a sign of the seriousness of the pandemic in Houston.

He began a weekly video series, which started as short messages of gratitude and encouragement to the Baylor College of Medicine community and expanded to cover COVID-19 information and science.

Research Klotman's research has been a blend of both basic and clinical research in molecular virology and AIDS pathogenesis. He developed the first small animal model of HIV associated nephropathy using transgenic techniques. He is the author of more than 200 publications and he has been a visiting professor and lecturer internationally in the field of HIV pathogenesis.

The Paul Klotman laboratory at Baylor studies HIV-associated nephropathy (HIVAN) and how the kidney responds to HIV infection. HIVAN only afflicts people of African descent, and remains a leading cause of renal disease in the African American community. Additionally, as highly active anti-retroviral therapy (HAART) is introduced to Africa, HIVAN represents a potential epidemic of renal disease.

On September 25, 2025, Klotman announced that he would retire as president, CEO, and executive dean of Baylor College of Medicine, effective June 30, 2026.

== Personal life ==
Klotman was born to academics Phyllis R. Klotman and Robert Klotman. Klotman's family is Jewish.

In 1986, Klotman was an assistant professor of medicine in the division of nephrology at Duke University School of Medicine and the Veterans Administration Medical Center. He was also director of the Duke University hypertension center.

Klotman married Mary E. Klotman on November 28, 1981 at the Duke Chapel. They met when she was an intern at Duke in 1981. As Mary is Catholic and Paul is Jewish, their minister was Unitarian Universalist, as they could not find a rabbi nor priest willing to marry them.

Mary Klotman is dean of Duke University School of Medicine. They are believed to be the only married couple to run two medical schools.

The Klotmans have two sons, one of whom was the first born via in vitro fertilization at Duke University.[1] The Klotmans have homes in Houston and Durham, N.C..

He is known for his culinary skills, which he perfected during the COVID-19 pandemic.
