= Mary E. Klotman =

American physician-scientist

- Born: Mary Frances Earley; 1954 (age 71–72); Long Island, New York
- Citizenship: United States
- Education: Duke University
- Spouse: Paul Klotman (m. 1981)
- Children: 2
- Scientific career
- Institutions: Duke University; Duke University School of Medicine; National Institutes of Health; Icahn School of Medicine at Mount Sinai

Mary Frances Earley Klotman (born 1954) is an American physician-scientist and academic administrator. She was elected as a member of the National Academy of Medicine in 2014 and became the editor of the Annual Review of Medicine in 2020. She has been the dean of the Duke University School of Medicine since 2017.

== Early life and education ==
Mary Frances Earley was born in 1954 on Long Island to parents Jean and Anthony Earley. She was one of six children in her family. Her father worked in the textile industry and frequently traveled for his job, including to North Carolina. Mary accompanied him on one such trip to Duke University, where she says she "fell in love" with the campus. Mary Earley attended Duke University for both her bachelor's degree in zoology and Doctor of Medicine.

== Career ==
Klotman has spent most of her research career studying the HIV, particularly its effect on the kidneys (HIV-associated nephropathy). After graduating with her MD, Klotman stayed at Duke to complete a residency in internal medicine and a fellowship in infectious disease. She was then an associate professor of medicine. In 1987, she joined the National Institutes of Health where she researched HIV with Flossie Wong-Staal. In 1991, she joined the United States Public Health Service at NIH under Robert Gallo. She then worked at the Icahn School of Medicine at Mount Sinai as the Irene and Dr. Arthur M. Fishberg Professor of Medicine, chief of the Division of Infectious Diseases, and co-director of its Global Health and Emerging Pathogens Institute. She returned to Duke in 2010 as the chair of its department of medicine and as the R.J. Reynolds Professor of Medicine. She taught pathology, microbiology, and molecular genetics. In 2017, she succeeded Nancy Andrews as the dean of the Duke University School of Medicine. She also became the vice chancellor for health affairs. In 2020, she succeeded C. Thomas Caskey as the editor of the Annual Review of Medicine. She was a finalist to serve as director of the NIH in 2022 before withdrawing from consideration.

== Awards and honors ==
Klotman was elected to the National Academy of Medicine in 2014. She received a Duke University School of Medicine Distinguished Alumni Award in 2015. She was formerly the president of the Association of American Physicians, Association of Professors of Medicine, and Duke Medical Alumni Association.

== Personal life ==
Mary Klotman is married to Paul Klotman whom she met while both were residents at the Duke University School of Medicine. They married at the Duke Chapel on November 28, 1981. As Mary is Catholic and Paul is Jewish, their minister was Unitarian Universalist, as they could not find a rabbi nor priest willing to marry them. The Klotmans have two sons, one of whom was the first successful live birth from a frozen embryo at Duke University.
