= Cecil H. Coggins =

American physician (1933–2019)

- Born: November 22, 1933; Long Beach, California
- Died: September 19, 2019 (aged 85)
- Education: Yale College; Harvard Medical School
- Partner: Clemency née Chase
- Children: 3
- Scientific career
- Institutions: Massachusetts General Hospital; United States Navy; Stanford University Medical Center; Harvard Medical School

Cecil Hammond Coggins (November 22, 1933–September 19, 2019), who went by Pete, was an American physician who specialized in nephrology, the branch of medicine dealing with the kidneys. He was the editor of the Annual Review of Medicine from 1994–2000.

== Early life and education ==
Cecil Hammond "Pete" Coggins was born on November 22, 1933, in Long Beach, California, to parents Dorothy née Hammond and Cecil Hengy Coggins. Because his father was a physician in the U.S. Navy, Pete traveled widely as a child. He lived in Oroville, California, Washington, D.C., and went to high school in Qingdao, China. He received his bachelor degree from Yale College in 1954 his Doctor of Medicine from Harvard Medical School in 1958. While in Oroville, he was employed by the Oroville Mercury-Register, the local newspaper.

== Career ==
Following medical school, he interned at Massachusetts General Hospital. Afterwards, he joined the United States Navy for two years and was stationed abroad in Cyprus. In June 1958, he became a lieutenant in the Navy Medical Corps.

He then completed a residency in internal medicine at Stanford University Medical Center, though moved back to the east coast in 1965 for a fellowship in nephrology at Massachusetts General Hospital. He continued his practice at the hospital in nephrology and internal medicine, then worked at Beacon Hill Practice. From 1965 to 2015 he was also an instructor at Harvard Medical School. In 1994, he succeeded William P. Creger as the editor of the Annual Review of Medicine. He held the editorship until 2000, at which time C. Thomas Caskey became editor.

== Personal life and death ==
He married art historian and archaeologist Clemency Chase in 1956, daughter of novelist Anya Seton and granddaughter of naturalist Ernest Thompson Seton and suffragist Grace Gallatin Seton Thompson. They had two sons and a daughter together. Coggins enjoyed outdoor activities like camping, hiking, and sailing: in 1991, he sailed on the Meridian, a 45 ft (14 m) sailboat, on a 21-day and 3,200 mi (5,100 km) journey from Scituate, Massachusetts, to Dartmouth, England. He also practiced knot tying. He died on September 19, 2019.
