= Maria Cardenas-Corona =

American geneticist and microbiologist

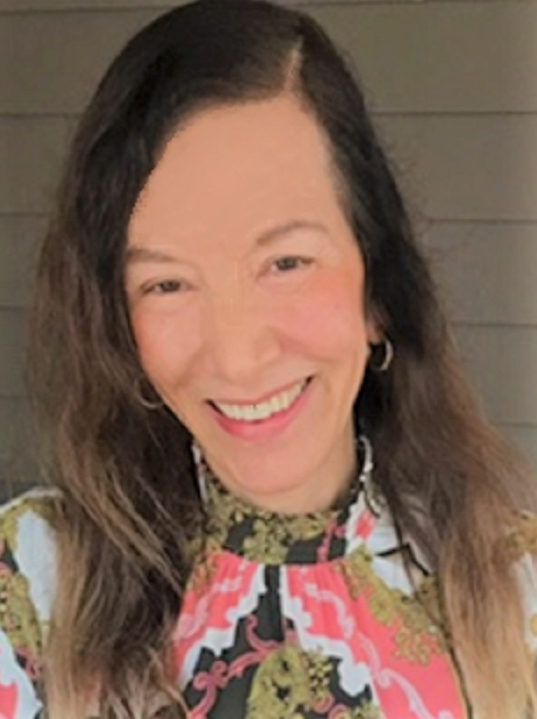
- Education: University of North Texas
- Scientific career
- Fields: Molecular genetics, microbiology
- Workplaces: Duke University School of Medicine; Center for Scientific Review

Maria Elena Cárdenas-Corona is an American geneticist and microbiologist specialized in cell signaling. She is a scientific review officer in the Center for Scientific Review. Cardenas-Corona is a research professor emeritus of molecular genetics and microbiology at Duke University School of Medicine.

== Career ==
Cardenas-Corona completed a Ph.D. at University of North Texas in 1988.

Cardenas-Corona was a faculty member of the Duke Cancer Institute and several Duke University graduate programs. She served on NIH study sections and review panels. She was a research professor emeritus of molecular genetics and microbiology at Duke University School of Medicine. During her academic career, her studies focused on the elucidation of the mechanism of action of the anti-cancer, immunosuppressive and anti-aging drug rapamycin, the dissection of its target in the mTORC1 signaling cascade, and the characterization of mTORC1 roles in cell fitness and growth control. Simultaneously, she conducted studies to elucidate the roles of the calcineurin pathway in stress responses and fungal virulence.

After retirement, Cardenas-Corona joined the Center for Scientific Review as a scientific review officer in the division of translational and clinical sciences.

Cardenas-Corona was elected Fellow of the American Association for the Advancement of Science for distinguish scientific contributions to the cell signaling field.
