= Suzanne Oparil =

American biologist

Suzanne Oparil is a clinical cardiologist and distinguished professor of medicine, professor of cell, developmental, and integrative biology. She is the section chief of vascular biology and hypertension and the director of the vascular biology and hypertension program of the Division of Cardiovascular Disease at the University of Alabama-Birmingham (UAB) Medical School.

Oparil earned an A.B. in zoology from Cornell University in 1961 and continued on to earn her medical degree in 1965, graduating in the top of her class from the Columbia University College of Physicians and Surgeons. After receiving further training at Columbia Presbyterian Hospital and completing her residency and cardiology fellowship at Massachusetts General Hospital, Oparil obtained her first faculty position at the University of Chicago in 1971. In 1975, she was promoted to associate professor before leaving the University of Chicago in 1977. It was in 1977 that Oparil began her work at the University of Alabama-Birmingham as an associate professor until her promotion to professor in 1981.

== Early life ==
Oparil was raised on a dairy farm in Elmira, New York, in the 1940s as the daughter of Czech immigrants. It was there, early in life, that she developed an appreciation of nature and a respect for its uncontrollable elements. She says “I was always interested in science and thought about pursuing a career in bench research like Madame Curie.” She credited her brother with inspiring her to become a doctor, telling her that she could still “do research and make a lot more money that way.”

She attended Cornell University as a National Merit Scholar, then went to Columbia University for medical school. She graduated first in her class from Columbia at a time when men outnumbered women in the program 9 to 1. She says she entered the field of cardiology because the late 1960s were a “golden age of new things in cardiology” and because her father died from congestive heart failure related to ischemic heart disease.

== Research ==
Oparil’s pioneering research and work with hypertension began during her time at Massachusetts General Hospital. As a postdoctoral fellow, she found that most of the vasoconstrictor angiotensin II is produced in the lungs. In most organs, angiotensin II is degraded as it is generated from angiotensin I via Angiotensin Converting Enzyme, preventing much from contributing to the total amount of active angiotensin in the body. In the lungs, the angiotensin II is not degraded, so its vasoconstrictive effects are felt in the body and can lead to hypertension. Her work led to the use of ACE inhibitors in hypertension treatment to keep angiotensin in its inactive state, angiotensin I. Dr. Oparil’s work with angiotensin and ACE inhibitors proved to be foundational to hypertension research.

Oparil continues to research novel approaches to treat hypertension as well as organ damage related to treatments. She also investigates hormonal modulation of inflammatory responses to vascular injury and mechanisms of estrogen-mediated vasoprotection. Since beginning her research in the 1970s, Oparil has authored or co-authored over 775 peer-reviewed articles in various aspects of cardiological diseases and medicine.

== Leadership in science and medicine ==
She served as the President of the American Heart Association, the American Society of Hypertension, and the American Federation for Medical Research. She has served on various National Institutes of Health (NIH) task forces, panels, and committees, including: the Panel on Scientific Boundaries for Review, NIH Center for Scientific Review, and the Special Emphasis Panel of the NIH Loan Repayment Program. She has been a member of several writing committees in hypertension research, as well as co-chair of the Joint National Committee responsible for developing guidelines for prevention, detection, evaluation, and treatment of hypertension in the United States.

Her work to progress the field of cardiovascular medicine has earned her the American Heart Association’s Council for High Blood Pressure Irving Page-Alva Bradley Lifetime Achievement Award, the Virginia Franz ’22 Award for Distinguished Women in Medicine, by the Columbia University College of Physicians and Surgeons, and the Dr. John Foerster Distinguished Lecture Award for Lifetime Achievements in the Field of Cardiovascular Medicine from the Institute of Cardiovascular Sciences.

== Tobacco industry controversy ==
In his book Golden Holocaust: Origins of the Cigarette Catastrophe and the Case for Abolition, Robert Proctor included Suzanne Oparil as an example of a paid witness for the tobacco industry in the years following the dissolution of the Council for Tobacco Research (CTR). He states that she received about $500,000 in funding from the CTR between 1989 and 1995. Later she testified in several suits on behalf of the CTR, crediting it as a “legitimate, valuable scientific research organization” citing its “cutting edge” work. In her testimony, Oparil would not state that smoking causes cancer or that it is addictive.
