= James Young (physician) =

James Morningstar Young (October 28, 1929 – June 4, 2008) was an American White House physician for presidents John F. Kennedy and Lyndon B. Johnson.

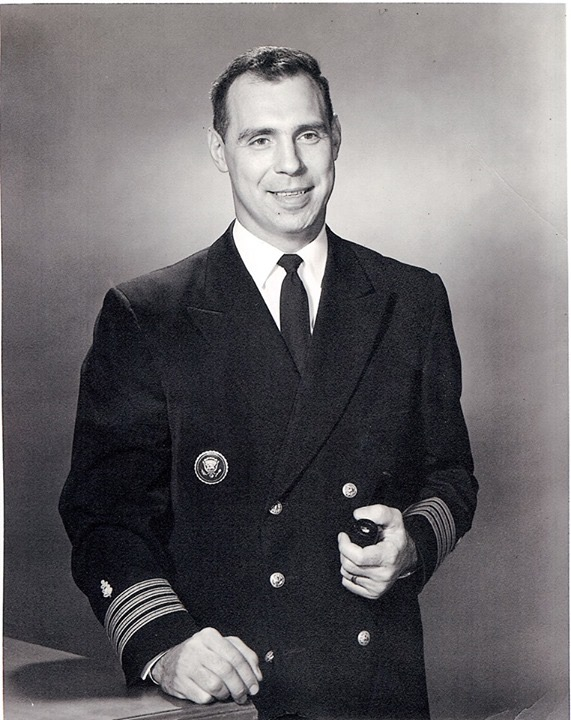
Capt james m young physician

Born in Massillon, Ohio, Young began his education in a one-room school house. He attended Massillon Washington High School and was captain of the football team during Paul Brown's tenure as coach. He received a full scholarship to attend Duke University, where he became captain of the football team and president of the student body government. While serving as the president of the student body, he was introduced to President Nixon for the first time. He was also a member of Sigma Alpha Epsilon fraternity and The Order of The Red Friars. After completing his degree in pre-medicine studies, he declined an offer to play for the NFL team, the LA Rams, in California and opted to continue onto Duke University School of Medicine where he obtained his Doctor of Medicine (M.D.) degree.

Young was on active duty with the U.S. Navy for twenty years between 1955 and 1975. He served as medical director aboard the USS Northampton, where he met president John F. Kennedy for the first time. A couple of months after meeting President Kennedy, Young was asked to become the President's personal physician. Following the acceptance of the President's request, he was promoted to the rank of captain in the Navy.

Young only cared for the Kennedy family for several months before the president was assassinated in 1963. On that day, Dr. Young was in the White House. When informed of the situation, Dr. Young went to the Secret Service Office where they were on the line with Dallas. After hearing how critical the President's wound was, he acknowledged the situation as hopeless, gestured a thumbs down to the room, and exited the room. He attended the President Kennedy's autopsy when his body returned to Washington, D.C. He slept in the White House for 3 nights following the assassination and then stayed with Jackie Kennedy at Camp David for 10 additional days- yet he never shared details from that time. He continued to remain in the White House as physician during President Johnson's term. He assisted with diagnosing LBJ with a poorly functioning gall bladder with stones; Johnson underwent surgery to remove his gall bladder in 1965. Dr. Young requested to transfer out of the White House in 1966.

Young was vice president and medical director of Massachusetts Blue Cross for 12 years. He assisted with drafting of the Twenty-Fifth Amendment to the Constitution. He was a guest lecturer at Harvard T.H. Chan School of Public Health. He also contributed to the book Managing Crisis: Presidential Disability and the Twenty-Fifth Amendment and appeared on the CNN special White House Doctors: The President's Shadow.

Young died on June 4, 2008, due to complications following a stroke he suffered in May the same year.
