= Sue Jinks-Robertson =

American professor of genetics and microbiology

Sue Jinks-Robertson is an American professor of genetics and microbiology. She is currently a professor in the Department of Molecular Genetics and Microbiology at the Duke University School of Medicine. In May 2019, she was elected to the National Academy of Sciences. She has published over 100 scientific articles in peer-reviewed journals.

== Education and academic appointments ==
Jinks-Robertson grew up in the Florida panhandle. She graduated from Agnes Scott College in Decatur, Georgia in 1977. In 1983, she obtained a Ph.D. in Genetics from the University of Wisconsin-Madison, where she studied ribosome biosynthesis in E. coli with Masayasu Nomura. She was a postdoctoral researcher with Tom Petes at the University of Chicago. From 1986 to 2006 she was a faculty member in the Biology Department at Emory University. In 2006, she moved to Duke University.

== Research ==
Jinks-Robertson studies topics in DNA repair, homologous recombination, and transcription-associated mutagenesis, using the yeast Saccharomyces cerevisiae as a model organism.

== Major awards and honors ==
Jinks-Robertson was elected as a Fellow of the American Academy of Microbiology in 2010, and of the American Association for the Advancement of Science in 2011. She was elected to the National Academy of Sciences in 2019.

== Academic service ==
Jinks-Robertson was Treasurer of the Genetics Society of America from 2014–2016. She is currently an Associate Editor for the journal DNA Repair. She is also a member of the Editorial Board of PLoS Genetics.
