= David A. Rytand =

American physician

- Born: November 4, 1909; San Francisco
- Died: November 23, 1991 (aged 82); Atherton, California
- Citizenship: US
- Education: Stanford University
- Partner: Nancy née Holmquist
- Children: 3
- Scientific career
- Institutions: Stanford University

David Abramson Rytand (November 4, 1909 – November 23, 1991) was an American physician from California. He spent sixty-five years at Stanford University, first as a student and then as a faculty member. He was the chair of the department of medicine from 1954 to 1960. He was the editor of the Annual Review of Medicine from 1955 to 1963.

== Early life and education ==
David Abramson Levy was born on November 4, 1909, in San Francisco, California, the only child of parents Hattie née Abramson and Henri Garfield Levy, who were Jewish. He attended Stanford University, graduating with his bachelor's degree in 1929 and his Doctor of Medicine in 1932. By age twenty, he was using the name "David Rytand". It has been speculated that he changed his surname from "Levy" to "Rytand" due to discriminatory Jewish quotas that were in effect for many American universities' admission processes. "Rytand" is an anglicization of "Rechtandt". Henri Levy's grandfather Solomon Isaac Rechtandt immigrated from Poland to San Francisco. As others could not correctly pronounce his last name, he changed it to "Levy".

== Career ==
After finishing medical school, Rytand remained at Stanford's department of medicine to complete an internship and residency. He then stayed on as a faculty member. The entirety of his fifty-nine-year career was spent at Stanford. He spent the 1930s and 1940s teaching and being a clinical consultant with an emphasis on internal medicine, particularly the physiology of the kidney. Following World War II, his focus shifted to cardiology. In 1954, he became the chair of the department of medicine at Stanford, succeeding Arthur L. Bloomfield; in 1958, he became the first Arthur L. Bloomfield Professor of Medicine, which was the first endowed chair in the school of medicine. He remained chair until 1960. In 1975, he became a professor emeritus and continued teaching.

He was editor of the Annual Review of Medicine beginning in 1955, succeeding Windsor C. Cutting. He held the position until 1963, at which time Arthur C. DeGraff became editor. He was a member of several scientific societies, including the American Society for Clinical Investigation, Western Society of Clinical Investigation, Western Association of Physicians, and California Academy of Medicine. He was president of the latter three organizations in 1954, 1959, and 1985, respectively.

== Awards and honors ==
Rytand is the eponym for the medical condition "Rytand murmur", as well as "Rytand's law". The Rytand murmur, or la maladie de Rytand, is a heart condition he described in 1946 from individuals with late diastolic heart murmurs correlated with calcification of the mitral annulus and atrioventricular block. He is also the namesake of the David A. Rytand Teaching Award for Excellence in Clinical Teaching at Stanford University School of Medicine. In 1984, he received one of the Stanford Medical School's highest honors, the Albion Walter Hewlett Award.

== Personal life and death ==
David Rytand married Nancy née Holmquist; the couple had three children. Rytand died on November 23, 1991, following a long illness.
