= Duke University School of Medicine =

Private medical school in Durham, North Carolina, US

- Type: Private medical school
- Established: 1925
- Founder: James B. Duke
- Parent institution: Duke University
- Affiliations: Duke University Hospital
- Dean: Mary E. Klotman
- Academic staff: 2,200+
- Students: 450
- Location: Durham, North Carolina, United States; 36.0007°N 78.9403°W
- Campus: Urban
- Colors: Blue and white
- Website: medschool.duke.edu

The Duke University School of Medicine, commonly known as Duke Med, is the medical school of Duke University. It was established in 1925 by James B. Duke.

The School of Medicine, along with the Duke University School of Nursing, Duke University Hospital, Duke Regional Hospital, Duke Children's Hospital, Duke Raleigh Hospital, and other affiliated hospitals, clinics, and laboratories, make up the Duke University Health System.

Clinical rotations by medical students and residents occur within the Duke University Health System, a fully integrated academic health care system encompassing a tertiary-care hospital and specialty clinics on the Medical Center campus, two community hospitals, a VA hospital, home health and hospice services, a network of primary care physicians, and other affiliated partners across the SE United States.

== History ==
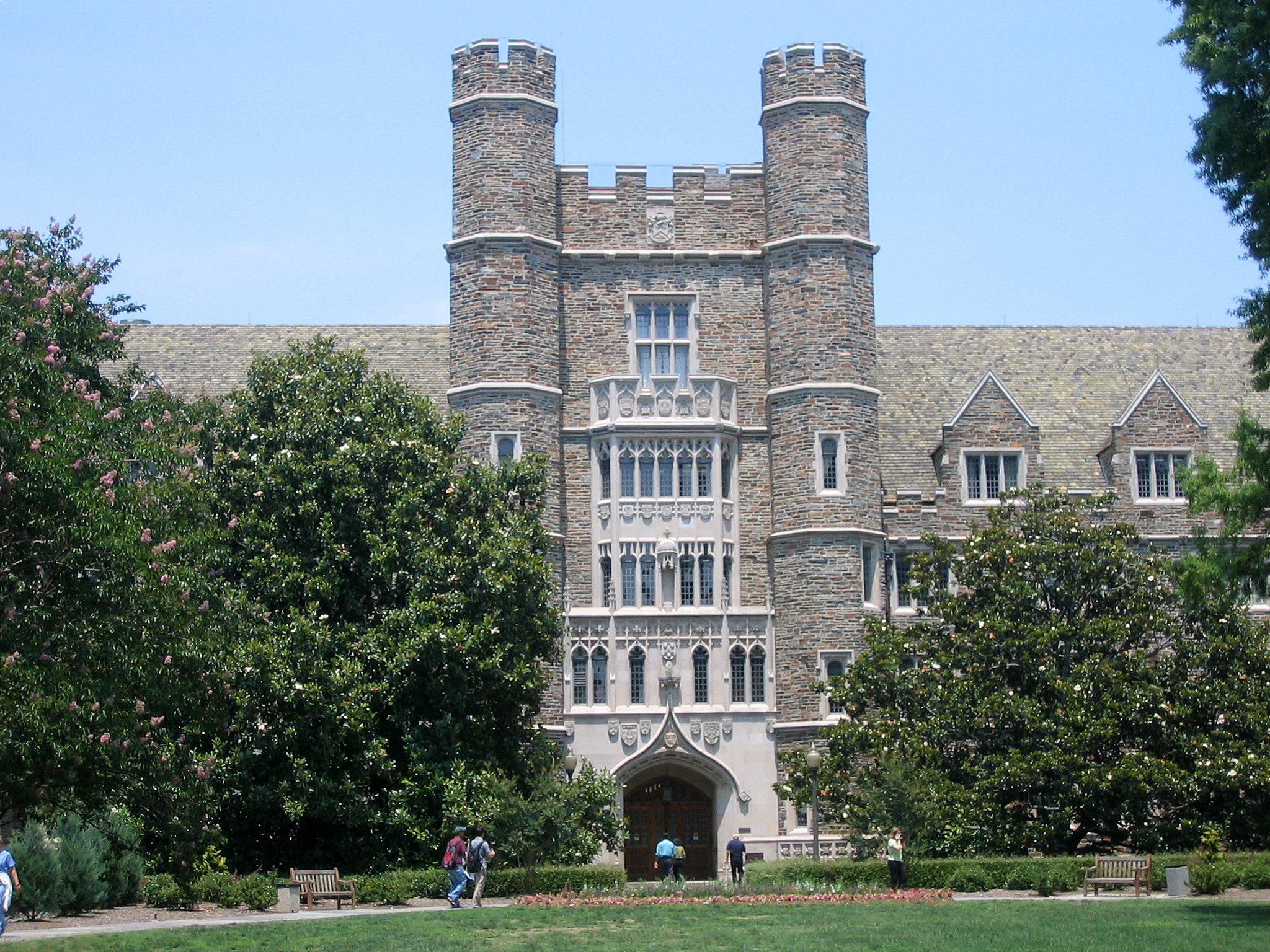
Duke Medical School

The idea of establishing a medical school at the current site dates back as far as 1891, when John Franklin Crowell, the president of Trinity College as it was known at the time, first announced a public plan to establish a school of medicine.

In 1924, James B. Duke established the Duke Endowment and directed $40 million to Trinity College to become Duke University. The following year, he made an additional request to establish the Duke School of Medicine, Duke School of Nursing, and Duke Hospital, with the goal of improving health care in the Carolinas and nationwide. Three thousand applicants applied to the new medical school in 1929 and 70 first- and third-year students were selected, including four women, for the School's inaugural class. Just four years after its establishment, Duke was ranked among the top 20 medical schools in the country by the AAMC.

Timeline of select research and patient care milestones

- 1937—Barnes Woodall establishes the nation's first brain tumor program.
- 1968—Robert Lefkowitz describes the adrenaline receptor.
- 1972—Child safety cap requirements championed by Jay Arena enacted as federal law.
- 1982—Pediatric immunologist Rebecca Buckley uses bone marrow transplantation to restore the immune systems of children born with severe combined immunodeficiency, also known as bubble boy disease.
- 1984—Bart Haynes contributes to the identification of HTLV-III, now known as HIV.
- 1990—Joanne Kurtzberg establishes the Duke Pediatric Blood and Marrow Transplant Program.
- 1994—Louise Markert demonstrates that babies born with no immune system, a fatal condition known as complete DiGeorge syndrome, can be cured with thymus transplantation.
- 1995—Duke scientists link the BRCA1 and BRCA2 genes to breast and ovarian cancers.
- 2001—Miguel Nicolelis develops a system that allows monkeys to control robot arms via brain signals, an important step to enable paralyzed people to control neuroprosthetic limbs.
- 2006—YT Chen and Priya Kishnani develop Myozyme as the first treatment for Pompe’s disease.
- 2011—Hai Yan leads a team of scientists from Duke and Johns Hopkins universities to identify mutations in a gene that makes cells immortal and appear to play a pivotal role in three of the most common types of brain tumors, as well as cancers of the liver, tongue and urinary tract.
- 2013—Duke researcher Jeffery Lawson and Laura Niklason of Yale School of Medicine, develop a bioengineered blood vessel, which Lawson grafted into an artery in a Duke patient’s arm, the first in-human procedure of its kind in the United States.
- 2015—Clinical trials using PVS-RIPO, a modified polio virus, to activate the host immune system to fight glioblastomas was featured on 60 Minutes. Preliminary findings have reported limited efficacy.
- 2019—Forty-five faculty members were named as some of the most highly cited researchers on a global list from Clarivate Analytics and Web of Science, placing Duke SOM in a three-way tie as the 8th ranked institution in the nation. These faculty include Robert Leifkowitz, Robert Califf, Jason Locasale, and Darell Bigner.

== Rankings and admissions ==
Duke University School of Medicine is recognised as one of the best medical schools in the United States and the world. It is currently ranked #3 in the country, according to U.S. News & World Report's rankings for best research medical schools in 2022. Several Duke programs are ranked as some of the highest in the country. Top-ten nationally ranked programs for 2022 include surgery (ranked #2), anesthesia (ranked #4), internal medicine (ranked #5), radiology (ranked #6), pediatrics (ranked #7), obstetrics/gynecology (ranked #8), and psychiatry (ranked #10). Historically, the Duke University School of Medicine consistently ranks in the top ten medical schools in the United States.

Admission to the school's medical degree program is highly competitive, with more than 7,500 applicants for approximately 115 openings each year. The school ranks very highly among its peers in the diversity of its medical students. Among the draws of the program is its unique curriculum, which gives students contact with patients a year earlier than at most other medical schools and includes an entire year devoted to independent research. Many students use the year to begin studies toward a second degree; nearly one-quarter earn a PhD, Master of Science in Global Health (MScGH), MBA, JD, or master's degree in addition to an MD. About 19.5 percent are enrolled in Duke's Medical Scientist Training Program, which leads to both an MD and a PhD in health-related basic biomedical or social science research. Created to train highly qualified students as physician-scientists, the Duke program is the fourth oldest in the country, has been continuously funded by the NIH for almost 50 years, and is highly regarded nationally.

Duke University School of Medicine also includes PhD programs in the basic sciences and education and training programs in other health professions, including the top-ranked Physician Assistant and Doctor of Physical Therapy programs, a Primary Care Leadership Track, Master of Biomedical Sciences, MS and PhD in Biostatistics, and Master of Management in Clinical Informatics.

== Collaboration with the National University of Singapore ==
Duke opened a medical school collaboration with the National University of Singapore. The Duke-NUS Graduate Medical School graduated their first class in 2011. The curriculum is similar in structure though the Duke-NUS campus focuses heavily on their team-based learning method called TeamLEAD (Learn, Engage, Apply, Develop).

== Affiliated research institutions ==
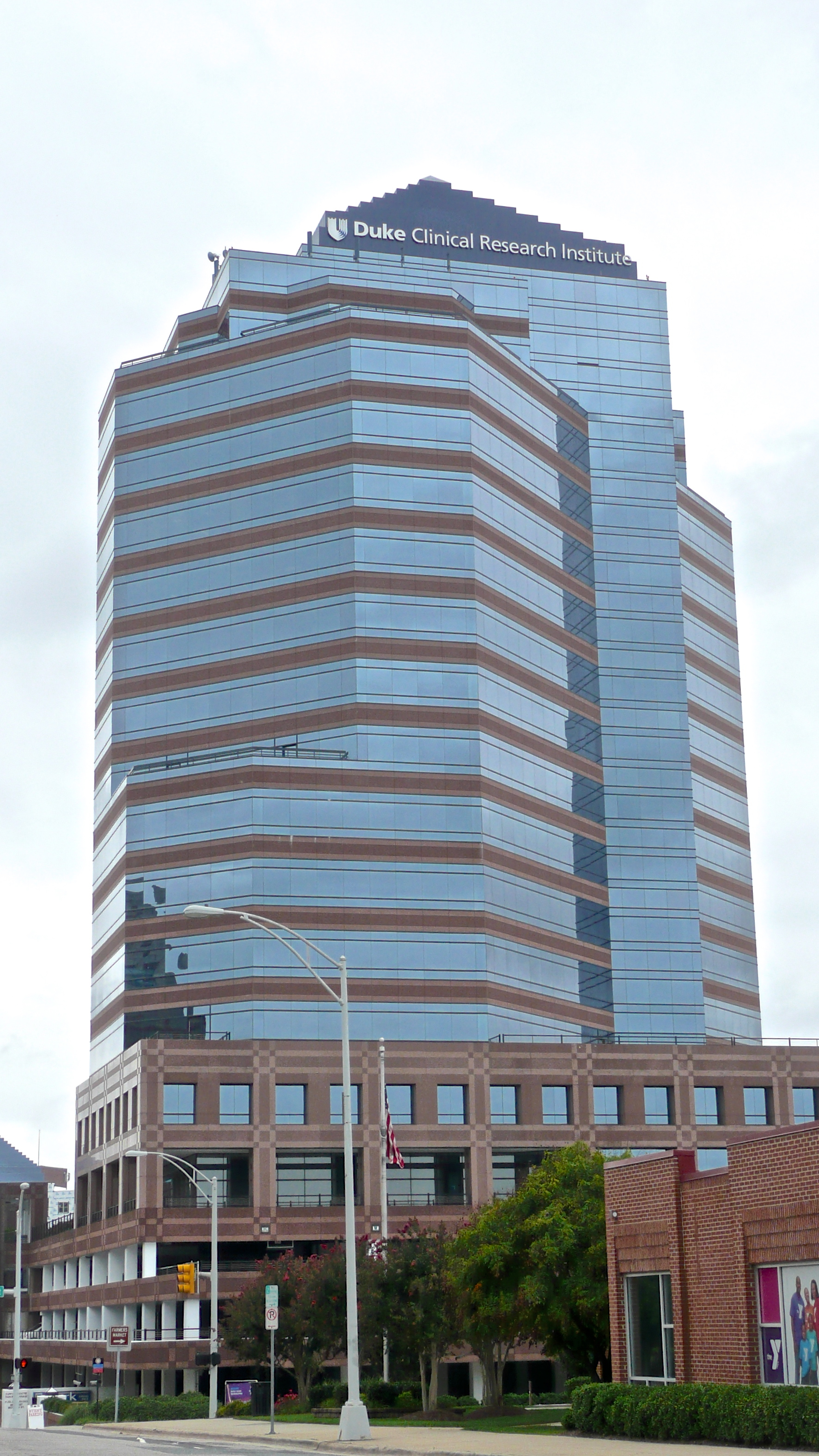
Duke Clinical Research Institute

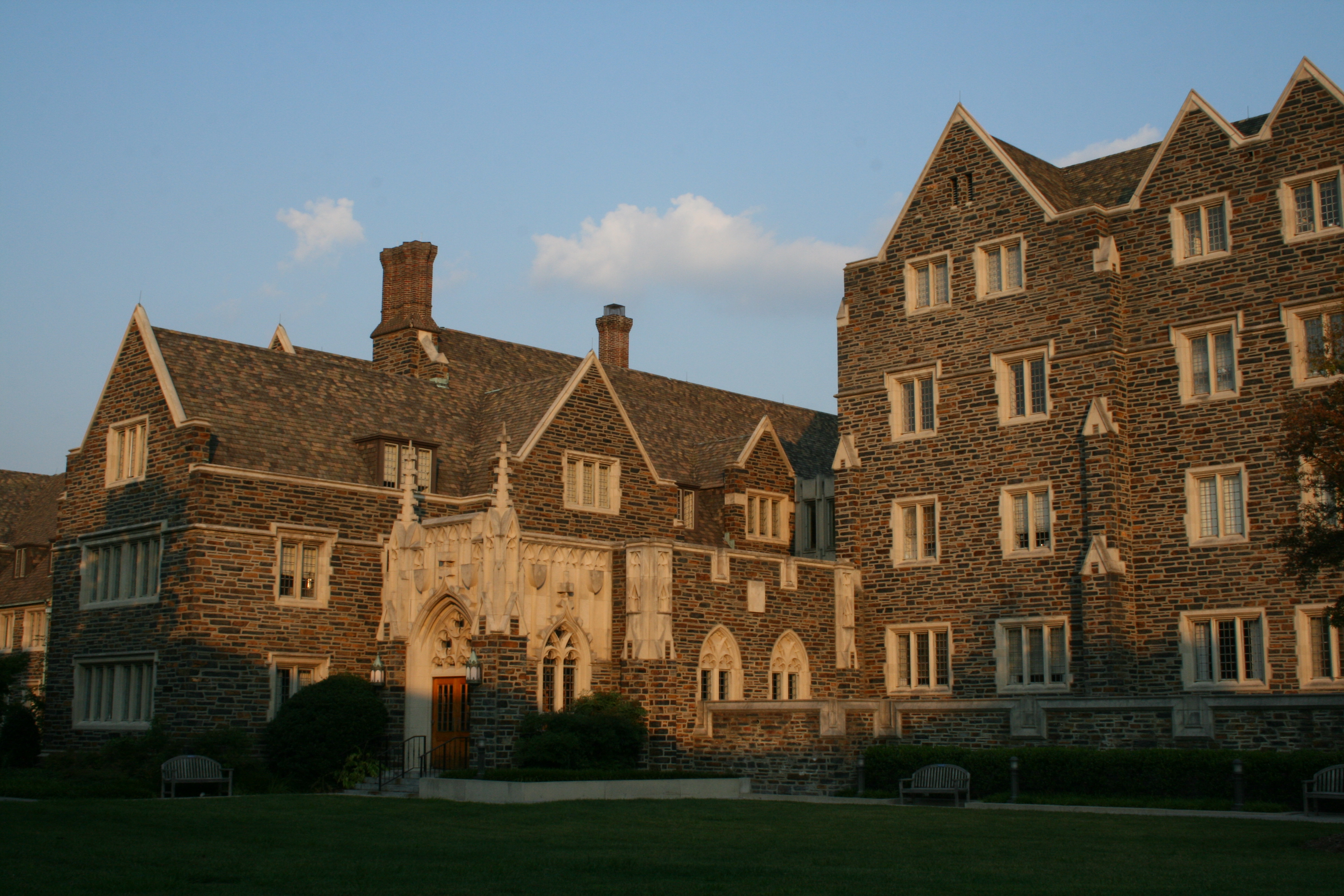
Duke Hospital South

- The Duke Clinical Research Institute (DCRI) performs all aspects of clinical research ranging from: Phase I through Phase IV clinical trials; outcomes research; registries of more than 100,000 patients; clinical research networks such as the Pediatric Trials Network; and economic and quality of life studies in populations spanning more than 20 therapeutic areas. It is home to the Duke Databank for Cardiovascular Diseases, the largest and oldest institutional cardiovascular database in the world, which continues to inform clinical decision-making 40 years after its founding.
- The Duke Global Health Institute (DGHI).
- The Trent Center for Bioethics, Humanities, and History of Medicine, the Center for Chemical Biology, and the Institute for Genome Sciences & Policy.
- Sarah W. Stedman Nutrition and Metabolism Center.
- The Duke Human Vaccine Institute (DHVI).
- The Duke Cancer Institute.
- The Duke Heart Center.
- The Duke Center for the Study of Aging and Human Development.
- Duke Integrative Medicine attempts to examine and quantify the treatment of chronic heart failure.

== Notable faculty and alumni ==
- William H. Muller Jr., first heart surgeon to implant an artificial aortic valve. Vice President and Head of the Department of Surgery for the University of Virginia Health System; Past President of the American College of Surgeons
- David H. Adams, heart valve surgery and mitral valve repair
- Raymond Delacy Adams, neurologist and Fellow of the American Academy of Arts and Sciences
- Barbara Dudley Alexander, infectious disease physician and past president, Infectious Diseases Society of America
- Lenox Baker, physician and public servant
- Charles E. Brady Jr., astronaut
- Julie Story Byerley, Pediatrician and Vice Dean for Education for the University of North Carolina at Chapel Hill School of Medicine
- Robert Califf, former commissioner at the Food and Drug Administration
- Maria Cardenas-Corona, geneticist and microbiologist
- George Eisenbarth, diabetologist and winner of the Banting Medal
- Irwin Fridovich, biochemist who discovered superoxide dismutase
- Vanessa Grubbs, nephrologist, researcher, author, and medical academic
- Eugene Gu, fetal tissue researcher and CEO of Ganogen Research Institute
- Philip Handler, biochemist and twice president of the National Academy of Sciences
- Abigail Johnston, Olympic silver medalist in diving, competed in the 2012 games as a Duke undergraduate and the 2016 games while a Duke medical student
- John G. Kelton, hematologist and Dean of the McMaster University Medical School and McMaster Faculty of Health Sciences, developed a diagnostic test for heparin-induced thrombocytopenia
- Samuel Katz, developer of measles vaccine and recipient of the Albert B. Sabin Gold Medal
- Mark S. Komrad (born 1957), psychiatrist and author
- Robert Lefkowitz, physician and biochemist who received the National Medal of Science and the 2012 Nobel Prize in Chemistry
- Sarah Lisanby, Transcranial magnetic stimulation pioneer and chair of Duke's Department of Psychiatry and Behavioral Sciences
- Paul Modrich, biochemist and member of the National Academy of Sciences who received the 2015 Nobel Prize in Chemistry
- Alexander Oshmyansky, radiologist and co-founder, CEO of Mark Cuban Cost Plus Drug Company.
- Ron Paul, physician (OB/GYN), United States Congressman from Texas
- Rand Paul, surgeon (ophthalmologist), United States Senator from Kentucky and candidate for the US presidential election in 2016
- Jane S. Richardson, biochemist and innovator of ribbon drawings as well as winner of a MacArthur Award
- Peter Agre, physician and molecular biologist who received the 2003 Nobel Prize in Chemistry
- Brian Kobilka, physician and biochemist who received the 2012 Nobel Prize in Chemistry
- James Young, USN Captain, White House physician to Presidents John F. Kennedy and Lyndon B. Johnson
- David Sabiston, Chairman of Surgery, author of a widely used textbook of surgery, performed a seminal procedure that paved the way for modern coronary-bypass surgery, grafting a vein from a patient's leg to bypass a blocked coronary artery during open-heart surgery. Legendary surgical educator
- James Wyngaarden, Chairman of Internal Medicine, long-time editor of Cecil's Textbook of Medicine and also The Metabolic Basis of Inherited Disease, Director of the National Institutes of Health (NIH), cofounder of Human Genome Project
- Eugene Stead, Chairman of Internal Medicine. His work paved way for development of cardiac catheterization, and he oversaw development of nation's first Physician's Assistant (PA) program
- Peter B. Cotton, Professor of Medicine. British gastroenterologist best known for his advancement in digestive disease, pioneering and naming the ERCP procedure.
- Nancy C. Andrews, pioneer in iron homeostasis and dean of Duke University School of Medicine
- Sue Jinks-Robertson, Professor of Genetics and Microbiology, studying DNA damage and repair. Fellow of the American Academy of Microbiology, American Association for the Advancement of Science, and the National Academy of Sciences.
- James R. Urbaniak, microsurgery pioneer
