= Jason Locasale =

American scientist

- Born: New Jersey, U.S.
- Education: Rutgers University (B.A.); Massachusetts Institute of Technology (Ph.D.); Harvard University (Postdoctoral Fellowship)
- Scientific career
- Fields: Cancer Research, Metabolism, Metabolomics, Nutrition
- Workplaces: Duke University
- Academic advisors: Lewis C. Cantley

Jason W. Locasale is an American scientist and former university professor. His focus is on metabolism.

== Education ==
Locasale graduated summa cum laude from Rutgers University with a dual degree in Chemistry and Physics. While completing his undergraduate degree, he received initial training in research in biochemistry and structural biology under Helen Berman. He earned a Ph.D. from the Massachusetts Institute of Technology. He went on to complete a postdoctoral fellowship at Harvard Medical School under Lewis C. Cantley.

== Career ==
Locasale began a lab at Duke University School of Medicine in 2015 as an assistant professor. He was an associate professor with tenure until 2024.

In 2019, he was subject to an internal review which resulted in a hiring freeze and his no longer being able to accept students. In 2020, he filed a civil suit against the university, claiming that his promotion to full professor was delayed due to racial discrimination. A preceding EEOC complaint was dismissed due to it being unable to conclude that discrimination had taken place. The lawsuit was settled in 2021.

== Research ==
Locasale has pioneered the use of methods to study metabolism using primarily liquid chromatography-mass spectrometry (LC-MS), in particular having developed methods to gain insights into numerous biological processes at once. He has made contributions to understanding the role of serine synthesis and one carbon metabolism in cancers, defining the quantitative, mechanistic principles of the Warburg Effect and altered glucose metabolism in cancer, and the role of metabolism in mediating chromatin status and epigenetics. His recent work which has gained widespread public attention has focused on the effects on dietary methionine restriction and diet in general as a therapeutic approach to extend lifespan and shape tumor response to therapy.

His research approaches integrate computational modeling, cell biology, mouse models, and genetic and biochemical experimentation to understand metabolic processes and their contribution to health. Currently, his research is in three interconnected areas: (1) Quantitative biology of metabolism, (2) Dietary interventions and metabolic therapeutics in health and cancer, and (3) The mechanistic basis between the interaction of metabolism and epigenetics.

== Awards and recognitions ==
Locasale is a recipient of the National Institutes of Health Pathway to Independence Award, the Benjamin Trump Award for Excellence in Cancer Research, and the American Cancer Society Research Scholar Award, and the JH Quastell Lectureship at McGill University. He has served on the editorial boards for a number of journals including PLoS Biology, Oncotarget, and Cell Stress, and has served in advisory roles for a number of companies. He has also maintained advisory roles at a number of federal, private and international scientific agencies including the National Institutes of Health, the American Cancer Society, and the Israel Science Foundation. He is also widely accomplished in academic mentoring with students and trainees having received the nation's highest honors at the undergraduate, doctoral, and postdoctoral levels.

Locasale has authored over 150 publications in peer-reviewed journals and numerous textbook chapters and patents. In 2019, he was named one of the most influential researchers of the past 10 years by Web of Science.
