= Duke University Human Vaccine Institute =

Vaccine research organization

Coordinates: 36.007738°N 78.943262°W

The Duke Human Vaccine Institute (DHVI), located in Durham, North Carolina, was formed to support Duke University School of Medicine's efforts to develop vaccines and therapeutics for HIV and other emerging infections. The vaccine strategy of the Duke CHAVI-ID is based on identifying and targeting novel HIV-1 vulnerabilities to B, T, and NK cell immune responses and using this information to design vaccines that will induce protective immunity at the time and location of HIV-1 transmission.

== History ==
The roots of the Duke Human Vaccine Institute (DHVI) began in 1985. Soon after the discovery of the human immunodeficiency virus (HIV), a working group was formed at Duke University to make a vaccine for AIDS. In 1990, the Duke Human Vaccine Institute, located in Durham, North Carolina, was formed to support Duke University School of Medicine's interdisciplinary efforts to develop vaccines and therapeutics for HIV and other emerging infections. DHVI received support from the Dean of the School of Medicine to recruit new faculty for HIV research and to apply for a Regional Center for Excellence in Emerging Infections and Biodefense grant from the National Institutes of Health (NIH) in 2002.

In 2003, the NIH funded the construction of the Duke Global Health Research Building, an infectious disease research facility and a Regional Biocontainment Laboratory (RBL). Completed in 2006, this building is designed to support basic research and to provide surge capacity in the event of a public health emergency.

In 2005, DHVI became the home to the NIAID-funded Center for HIV/AIDS Vaccine Immunology; a $350 million grant to speed the development of an AIDS vaccine was made. This was led by Barton Haynes. Over the next 7 years (beginning in 2012), the Duke CHAVI-ID builds on CHAVI to improve HIV-1 vaccine design.
