= Metro TeenAIDS =

Non-profit organization in Washington, D.C.

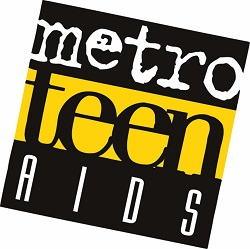

Metro TeenAIDS (MTA) was a nonprofit organization based in Washington, DC, in operation from 1988 to 2015. MTA addressed the severe HIV/AIDS epidemic in the National Capital region by focusing on the needs of children and youth. For more than 25 years, MTA provided a wide variety of HIV prevention services to youth, as well as services for youth affected by HIV/AIDS in the District of Columbia and the surrounding area.

== History ==
Metro TeenAIDS (MTA) was founded in 1988 by a group of doctors at Children's National Medical Center who called for a community-based response, as well as a medical response, to the HIV epidemic. They formed the Washington Area Consortium on HIV/AIDS In Youth (WACHIVIY), and began offering HIV prevention education services to District youth in 1989 under the leadership of Dr. Lawrence (Larry) D'Angelo, Director of the Burgess Clinic at Children's National Medical Center. WACHIVIY began doing business as Metro TeenAIDS in 1992, changing its name in order to better reflect its client base.

In 1990, after the death of Ryan White, Metro TeenAIDS established the Ryan White Youth Service Awards, "to recognize notable contributions in the fight against adolescent HIV/AIDS." In 1997, Second Lady of the United States Tipper Gore joined MTA on World AIDS Day to present the award to Secretary of the Department of Health and Human Services Donna Shalala.

In 1993, Metro TeenAIDS worked with several young people from local DC high schools to help start what became the biggest HIV conference focused exclusively on young people – the Ryan White National Conference on HIV and AIDS.

In 1995, MTA's annual budget was $300,000 and 25% of that budget came from the DC Department of Health. In 1997, when MTA expanded its programs to the Maryland and Virginia suburbs, its annual budget was around $1 million and it had a staff of 15 paid adults. From 2003 to 2012, MTA experienced rapid growth: from revenue of $804,000 in FY 2003 to $3.7 million in FY 2013.

In 2007, the Nonprofit Roundtable of Greater Washington featured MTA in its report called "Beyond Charity: Recognizing Return on Investment".

In 2011, Metro TeenAIDS acquired the programs and other assets of Pediatric AIDS/HIV Care (PAHC). PAHC had provided comprehensive psychosocial services, including individual and group therapy, grief counseling, educational enrichment, social, cultural and recreational activities, mentoring and parental support to children of HIV positive parents regardless of their own HIV status. MTA absorbed their clients and physical location, providing services to their youth so that there was no gap in their access to care. The following year, MTA formalized this support with federal funding for its STABLE Families program, helping to mitigate the impact of HIV/AIDS on families.

During the 2012 International AIDS Conference, MTA was featured in the opening of the conference. Additionally, MTA was chosen for a site visit by Michel Sidibé, the Executive Director of UNAIDS, the Joint United National Programme on HIV/AIDS, and Under-Secretary-General of the United Nations as an exemplary HIV/AIDS program for young people and families. While at MTA, Sidibé met with MTA Executive Director Adam Tenner, MTA staff, and youth peer educators.

In 2012, MTA presented Representative Nancy Pelosi, D-CA and Speaker of the House, with the inaugural Pelosi Leadership Award to honor her efforts to combat HIV/AIDS.

MTA was featured on the Discovery Channel's 2012 documentary HIV/AIDS: America's Divide, which featured front-line AIDS organizations and the epidemic's impact on people of color.

== Focus on policy change ==
MTA's approach to advocacy was highlighted in an in-depth case study in the book Cases in Innovative Nonprofits: Organizations that Make a Difference. The authors describe MTA's programmatic expansion in the 2000s from strict service provision to include local and national advocacy. By adding an advocacy component to the organization's programs, MTA educated policymakers about the needs of youth with respect to HIV/AIDS, keeping youth on the agenda and helping to ensure funding for dedicated youth programs and services in an environment that often focuses on the needs of adults.

Like many other AIDS service organizations, MTA offered a wide range of programs, including peer education; youth leadership development; HIV/STI/pregnancy testing and referrals; evidence-based sexual and reproductive health education in schools; and a capacity building program to help other youth-serving professionals offer culturally competent youth services. What set MTA apart from many AIDS service organizations was its commitment to advocacy work and policy change to improve the lives of young people into the future.

In 2005, in an effort to address HIV/AIDS and adolescent sexual and reproductive health from a system level, MTA began developing an advocacy program to educate City Council members and others about policies that would lead to positive health outcomes for youth.

In 2007, MTA and the MTA-led DC Healthy Youth Coalition (DCHYC) succeeded in getting the Health Learning Standards passed. MTA and the DCHYC used a grassroots approach to achieve this goal, including multiple stakeholders in discussions and advocacy efforts. The Health Learning Standards set benchmarks to begin to assess student health knowledge, and MTA Executive Director, Adam Tenner, helped to draft the education standards. He hoped that future curricula would weave HIV/AIDS into multiple disciplines rather than isolating discussion of HIV to health or science classes.

In 2010, MTA was instrumental in getting the City Council to pass the Healthy Schools Act (HSA). The HSA mandated that students in DC public schools and public charter schools receive at least 15 minutes of health education per week until 2014, at which point the minimum would increase to 75 minutes per week. In addition, schools were obligated to report annually on health learning standards and progress in meeting these standards. These policy changes were achieved after five years of intensive consensus-building around the importance of health education and services for DC's youth, and were a response to data indicating that DC youth continue to have poorer health outcomes than their peers nationally. Because schools did not have the health education staff in place to meet the requirements of the HSA, MTA began teaching an extensive health education curriculum in schools and training teachers to assume the responsibility of teaching these classes in the future.

As part of the Healthy Schools Act of 2010, the City Council approved a measure mandating the inclusion of health education questions on the DC Comprehensive Assessment System (DC-CAS), the standardized test administered to public school and charter school students each spring. When health questions appeared on the Comprehensive Assessment System (DC-CAS) standardized test for 5th and 8th graders in 2012, in part due to years of advocacy by MTA and others, DC became the first jurisdiction in the country to systematically monitor the quality of health education across the city. As a result, the quality of health education across the District could be measured, creating an incentive for schools to continue improving their health education program and keeping health education on the city's agenda.

== Changes in funding and vision for sustainability ==
As mentioned above, MTA's revenue grew from $804,000 in FY 2003 to $3.7 million in FY 2013. Existing programs expanded and new program areas and staff were added. Although the organization experienced unprecedented growth in this period, changes in the local funding environment, as well as projected changes in the national funding landscape due to the Patient Protection and Affordable Care Act, made it difficult for the organization's leadership to envision sustaining its budget and scope of programming when they looked more than two years into the future.

MTA's Board of Directors and Executive Director determined that the best course of action to continue MTA's programs into the future was to join forces with a Federally Qualified Health Center that would be able to bill Medicaid and insurance for services and that would provide seamless integration of HIV prevention and treatment services for DC youth. In order to avoid closing suddenly and potentially leaving clients stranded, as well as to ensure the long-term viability of its programming, MTA aligned with Whitman-Walker Health in February 2015. AIDS United commissioned a report on MTA's deliberative process entitled "Is It Time to Close?". This report was designed to help other AIDS service organizations make decisions about future sustainability.

MTA's mission and vision statements served as guides for Metro TeenAIDS' leadership and staff during the transition.

Mission Statement: Metro TeenAIDS (MTA) is a community health organization dedicated to partnering with young people to end HIV/AIDS. Through education, support and advocacy, MTA works to prevent the transmission of HIV, promote informed decision making and improve the quality of life for all young people, especially those living with or impacted by HIV/AIDS.

Vision Statement: Metro TeenAIDS envisions an HIV/AIDS-free generation where young people thrive as healthy and safe members of a community free of stigma and barriers - eliminating the need for Metro TeenAIDS.

== See also ==
- Whitman-Walker Health
- HIV/AIDS in the United States
