= Western Association of Physicians =

The Western Association of Physicians (WAP) is a regional health association of academic physician-scientists. Over the years the society has grown to a membership of several hundred, including many distinguished academicians from diverse areas of medicine.

== History ==
It was founded in 1955 by Robert Williams, the Chair of the Department of Medicine at the University of Washington, and other eminent physicians with the aim of establishing a western society analogous to the Association of American Physicians. Along with Williams, the founders of the WAP were Maxwell Wintrobe, Theodore Althausen, Joseph Ross, Clement Finch, David A. Rytand, John Lawrence, and Gordon Meiklejohn. The organization's bylaws were approved in 1969.

== Annual meeting ==
The Western Association of Physicians meets annually in Carmel, California, to discuss and present research and other educational programs. Through 2016, the event was called the Western Regional Meeting; starting in 2017, it became the Western Medical Research Conference (WMRC), in partnership with other regional medical societies. The conference is held in late January.
