= Phyllis R. Klotman =

American film theorist

- Born: Phyllis Helen Rauch; September 9, 1924; Galveston, Texas
- Died: March 30, 2015 (aged 90); New York, New York
- Occupations: Professor, Archivist, Film theorist
- Spouse(s): Robert Klotman (m. 1943–2012)
- Children: Paul Klotman
- Parent(s): Isadore & Esther Rauch

Phyllis R. Klotman (September 9, 1924 – March 30, 2015) was a film theorist, archivist, professor and later dean for women's affairs at Indiana University, Bloomington. She established the Black Film Center/Archive at Indiana University and championed African-American filmmakers. Klotman is the author of Another Man Gone: The Black Runner in Contemporary Afro-American Literature (1977); Frame by Frame: A Black Filmography (1979); and Struggles for Representation: African American Documentary Film and Video (1999).

== Early years ==
Klotman was born in Galveston, Texas in 1924. Her father, Isadore Rauch, migrated to the United States from Eastern Europe and came to Texas as part of the Galveston Movement. He was a door-to-door salesman and a member of the Merchant Marine in World War 1. Klotman's mother, Esther, was from New York City. The family was Orthodox Jewish.

Klotman attended public school in Galveston and noted in an interview that while her school was segregated, her neighborhood was not. She grew up poor during the Great Depression and has recounted being discriminated against by her teachers and peers for following Orthodox Judaism.

== Personal life ==
Klotman's family did not have enough money to send her to college right away. Though she was trained as a secretary, she went to work as a ship dispatcher for the National Maritime Union. The left-wing union was one of the few integrated spaces in Galveston, and Klotman became good friends with the secretary, an African-American woman. She eventually joined the NAACP at the same time as two white men she knew from the union.

In 1941, Klotman met her husband, Robert, through a blind date arranged by her sister. They were married in 1943. Robert, who was originally from Cleveland, Ohio, served in the United States Army during WWII, and Klotman followed him during his relocations to bases in Missouri and California while working for the American Red Cross. She said she did not know at the time that the Red Cross segregated blood plasma and did not find out until several years later.

Klotman and her husband had three children, but lost their first, Eric, to Tay-Sach's disease when he was two years old. Klotman is also the mother of Paul Klotman, the current president and CEO of Baylor College of Medicine in Houston, Texas.

== Education ==
Klotman took her first college course part-time at Case Western Reserve University in Cleveland when she was 29 years old. In 1961, she graduated summa cum laude with B.A. degrees in English and French from Cleveland College, the school for adults at Western Reserve University. After graduation, she was awarded the Woodrow Wilson Fellowship in American Studies. She earned her master's degrees in American studies and English in 1963 and was a teaching fellow at Case Western for two years after.

After moving to Michigan with her family in 1967, Klotman became an English instructor at the Lawrence Institute of Technology in Southfield, Michigan, while continuing to go to school part-time. She received doctoral degrees in English and Afro-American literature/American literature from Case Western in 1969 with a dissertation on African American narrative.

== Career ==
In 1970, Robert was hired to build a music education program at Indiana University's Jacobs School of Music in Bloomington, Indiana. Klotman commuted to her new position as assistant professor in English at Indiana State University. While there, she taught the school's first course in black literature. The next year, she was hired by Dr. Herman C. Hudson as an assistant professor of Afro-American Studies at Indiana University, which was in the midst of building an Afro-American Studies Department. She has praised Hudson for allowing her to create her own courses and write them into the curriculum. Klotman was promoted to full professor in 1978. She and Robert took several trips together as visiting professors to schools in Yugoslavia, China, and across the United States.

Klotman became the Dean of Women's Affairs at IU in 1986 and remained in that position until 1993.

== Preservation ==
Klotman founded the journal Black Camera and helped to amass a large archive on black cinema at Indiana University which now includes thousands of films, photographs, oral histories and memorabilia.
