= Annual Review of Medicine =

- Discipline: Medicine
- Language: English
- Edited by: Howard A. Rockman

Publication details
- History: 1950–present
- Publisher: Annual Reviews (United States)
- Frequency: Annually
- Open access: Subscribe to Open
- Impact factor: 18.8 (2025)

Standard abbreviations
- ISO 4: Annu. Rev. Med.

Indexing
- CODEN: ARMCAH
- ISSN: 0066-4219 (print); 1545-326X (web)
- OCLC no.: 185032468

Links
- Journal homepage

The Annual Review of Medicine is a peer-reviewed medical journal that publishes review articles about all aspects of medicine. It was established in 1950. Its longest-serving editors have been William P. Creger (1974–1993) and C. Thomas Caskey (2001–2019). The current editor is Howard A. Rockman As of 2023, Annual Review of Medicine is being published as open access, under the Subscribe to Open model. As of 2026, Journal Citation Reports gives the journal a 2025 impact factor of 18.8, ranking it second of 191 titles in the category "Medicine, Research & Experimental".

== History ==
The first volume of the journal was published in 1950 by Annual Reviews (AR), a nonprofit organization whose stated mission is to synthesize knowledge "for the progress of science and the benefit of society." The journal's first editor was Windsor C. Cutting. The volume's preface noted that the more "active" areas of medicine would be covered in each volume, while other subdisciplines would be covered every two or three years. In 1996, it became one of the first AR journals to be published electronically.

=== Editors of volumes ===
Dates indicate publication years in which someone was credited as a lead editor or co-editor of a journal volume. The planning process for a volume begins well before the volume appears, so appointment to the position of lead editor generally occurred prior to the first year shown here. An editor who has retired or died may be credited as a lead editor of a volume that they helped to plan, even if it is published after their retirement or death.

- Windsor C. Cutting (1950–1954)
- David A. Rytand (1955–1963)
- Arthur C. DeGraff (1964–1973)
- William P. Creger (1974–1993)
- Cecil H. Coggins (1994–2000)
- C. Thomas Caskey (2001–2019)
- Mary E. Klotman (2020–2025)
- Howard A. Rockman (2025–present)

== Abstracting and indexing ==
The journal is abstracted and indexed in:

- BIOSIS Previews
- CAB Abstracts
- Chemical Abstracts Service
- EBSCO databases
- Embase
- Index Medicus/MEDLINE/PubMed
- ProQuest databases
- Science Citation Index Expanded
- Scopus
