= William P. Creger =

American internist

- Born: April 15, 1922; San Francisco, California, United States
- Died: August 9, 2013 (aged 91)
- Education: Stanford University
- Partner: Nancy née Smith
- Children: 4
- Awards: Guggenheim Fellowship
- Scientific career
- Institutions: Stanford University; United States Army

William Philip Creger (April 15, 1922–August 9, 2013) was an American internist with a specialty in hematology. He was both a student and faculty member at Stanford and won a Guggenheim Fellowship for his research in 1970. He was also the editor of the Annual Review of Medicine from 1974 to 1993.

== Early life and education ==
William Philip Creger was born on April 15, 1922, in San Francisco to parents Matilda née Abrahams and Henry N. Creger, a physician. He recalled watching the construction of the Golden Gate Bridge through the window of his family's apartment on Broadway Street. He attended Stanford University for his bachelor's degree (1943) and his Doctor of Medicine (1947).

== Career ==
Creger became a faculty member at Stanford in 1949; in 1952 he became a full professor. He took leave from Stanford during the Korean War, as he served in the United States Army as a captain. In the military, he conducted research on tuberculosis. From 1968–1977, he was the associate dean of student affairs. Other positions he held at Stanford included head of its division of hematology and director of the clinical laboratories at Stanford University Medical Center. He received a Guggenheim Fellowship in 1970 in the "Medicine and Health" category. Creger retired from Stanford in 1992.

In 1974, he succeeded Arthur C. DeGraff as the editor of the Annual Review of Medicine. He held the position until 1993, at which point Cecil H. Coggins became editor.

== Personal life and death ==
Creger had varied interests. He played the viola in a string quartet, enjoyed reading Sherlock Holmes stories and the poetry of Yeats, and gardened. He and his wife Nancy née Smith married in 1950 and had four children. Creger died on August 9, 2013, at the age of 91.
