= Arthur C. DeGraff =

American cardiologist

- Born: December 3, 1899; Paterson, New Jersey
- Died: May 25, 1983 (aged 83); Hartford, Connecticut
- Citizenship: US
- Education: New York University
- Partner: Dorothy née Dodd
- Children: 3
- Scientific career
- Institutions: New York University; Bellevue Hospital; University Hospital; Jewish Memorial Hospital

Arthur Christian DeGraff Sr. (December 3, 1899–May 25, 1983) was an American cardiologist and teacher. Born in New Jersey, he went to school and spent his career in New York at various hospitals. He was a professor at New York University from 1932–1980, and the editor of the Annual Review of Medicine from 1964–1973.

== Early life and education ==
Arthur Christian DeGraff was born in Paterson, New Jersey, on December 3, 1899. His parents were Trina née Cooper, an immigrant from the Netherlands, and Christian DeGraff, a plumber, who was born to immigrants from the Netherlands. He had a younger brother, Jacob. He attended New York University for both his bachelor's degree and Doctor of Medicine.

== Career ==
DeGraff was one of the early researchers in the development and use of cardiac glycoside drugs. He also had an emphasis on the treatment of pediatric heart conditions. In 1932, he was named the Samuel A. Brown professor of therapeutics at New York University. He held the position until 1980, at which time he became the professor emeritus. He was a visiting physician at Bellevue Hospital in New York City and an attending physician at University Hospital. He accepted a position as the director of medicine at Jewish Memorial Hospital in 1964, remaining the director until November 1968. He retired from practicing medicine in 1978.

He was a member of several scientific societies, including the American Society for Clinical Pharmacology and Therapeutics, of which he was president. He was also chair of the United States Pharmacopeia and the medical board of Irvington House. He succeeded David A. Rytand as the editor of the Annual Review of Medicine in 1964; upon stepping down in 1973, he was replaced by William P. Creger.

== Personal life and death ==
DeGraff married Dorothy née Dodd; the couple had three sons. In his later life, he and Dorothy divided their time between Newtown, Connecticut, and Warm Mineral Springs, Florida. He died in Hartford, Connecticut, on May 25, 1983, at the age of 83.
