= Windsor C. Cutting =

American physician and researcher

- Born: July 30, 1907; Campbell, California
- Died: May 29, 1972 (aged 64); Haleiwa, Hawaii
- Education: Stanford University
- Partner: Mary née Weaver
- Children: 6
- Scientific career
- Institutions: Courtauld Institute of Biochemistry; Johns Hopkins School of Medicine; Stanford University; University of Hawaiʻi

Windsor Cooper Cutting (July 30, 1907–May 29, 1972) was an American physician and researcher from California. His research focused on cancer, fertility, and chemotherapy of viral infections. He was the founding editor of two medical journals: the Annual Review of Medicine and the Annual Review of Pharmacology.

== Early life and education ==
Windsor Cooper Cutting was born on July 30, 1907, in Campbell, California to parents May and Theodore Cooper, both graduates of nearby Stanford University. Theodore was a high school teacher, and May was a nurse. He had a brother, Cecil. His grandfather was a physician whose practice was in Campbell. Cutting attended Stanford University, graduating in 1928 with his bachelor's degree and in 1932 with his Doctor of Medicine.

== Career ==
After graduating from medical school, he worked in a variety of medical disciplines as he sought to discover his interests. He spent a year under Henry G. Mehrtens of the psychiatry division of Stanford School of Medicine before pursuing internal medicine under Arthur L. Bloomfield. He then spent a year abroad at the Courtauld Institute of Biochemistry in London with Charles Dodds. Following that, he worked at the Johns Hopkins School of Medicine in Baltimore from 1936 to 1938 with E. K. Marshall, where he cemented his interest in pharmacology. He accepted an assistant professor position at Stanford in 1938, teaching in the department of pharmacology, ultimately becoming the chair of the department in 1950. His research interests centered on chemotherapy of viral infections, reproductive medicine and fertility, and cancer. In summer of 1953, he was made the acting dean of the Stanford Medical School following the resignation of Loren Chandler; in December, he was named the dean. He resigned as dean in 1957.

He was the founding editor of the Annual Review of Medicine in 1950. He was editor for the first five volumes and was succeeded by David A. Rytand in 1955. Similarly, he was the first editor of the Annual Review of Pharmacology, first published in 1961. He held that editorship until 1970. He was on the board of directors of Annual Reviews from 1957–1970.

In 1964 he went to Hawaii to become the first director of the Pacific Biomedical Research Center, the predecessor of the School of Medicine at the University of Hawaiʻi. He helped create a two-year program at the school, of which he became the dean in 1965. He remained the dean until July 1971.

Cutting authored more than 200 publications, including several books: Manual of Clinical Therapeutics (1943), Actions and Uses of Drugs (1946), and Cutting's Handbook of Pharmacology (1962).

== Personal life and death ==
Cutting was an outdoorsman who enjoyed camping, hiking, and fishing. He also enjoyed reading and painting with oils and watercolors—mostly landscapes. He married Mary née Weaver; together they had six children.

Cutting had a serious illness in 1971 that required major surgery, though it appeared that he fully recovered. He died unexpectedly on at his home in Haleiwa, Hawaii on May 29, 1972.
