= Mark S. Komrad =

American psychiatrist (born 1957)

Mark S. Komrad (born June 26, 1957, New York, New York, United States) is an American psychiatrist on the clinical and teaching staff of the Johns Hopkins Hospital in Baltimore. He is the author of You Need Help: A Step-by-Step Plan to Convince Your Loved One to Get Counseling.

== Education ==
Komrad completed an undergraduate degree at Yale University summa cum laude in molecular biophysics and biochemistry where he was elected to the Phi Beta Kappa honor society and graduated first in his residential college in 1979. He earned his Doctor of Medicine (M.D.) degree at Duke University School of Medicine in 1983 and received the Thomas Jefferson Award and the Joseph Eldridge Markee Memorial Award in Anatomy. During his medical education, Komrad was awarded a fellowship at the Hastings Center for bioethics. Komrad was a resident in internal medicine followed by a residency in psychiatry, both at the Johns Hopkins Hospital.

== Media, Hollywood and public education ==
Komrad was the host of the weekly radio talkshow "Komrad on call" on the American Radio Network in the 1990s. He was then the regular psychiatrist guest on the National Public Radio (NPR) radio show "Sunday Rounds with John Stupak". He has appeared on TV and radio to discuss topics in psychiatry. He is now the mental health contributor to the NPR show, "Mid-Day with Dan Rodricks" broadcast from WYPR and for "The Medical Hour" broadcast from WCBM .

Komrad consulted as technical advisor to the movie "Silent Fall," to help develop portrayals of the two psychiatrists Richard Dreyfus and John Lithgow He has consulted to other dramatic productions and lectured about how Hollywood depicts psychiatry, psychiatric treatment, and the ethics of therapy. He has also produced and performed the public service announcements about psychiatry and mental health for The Maryland Foundation for Psychiatry broadcast on WBAL radio.

On Komrad's radio shows, a common "open phones" question has been about how to convince a troubled friend or loved-one to get a professional mental health evaluation. He travels throughout the country giving workshops and lectures on how to help people convince troubled loved one's to get psychiatric treatment and other topics in psychiatry, as well as his "Ask the Doctor" lectures, where audiences can ask open questions about mental illness and psychiatric treatment, similar to the "open phones" hours on his radio shows. His book, workshops, and public lectures garnered him the "Exemplary Psychiatrist Award" from the National Alliance on Mental Illness (NAMI) and the Frances J. Lentz Memorial "Mental Health Professional of the Year" Award from the Metropolitan Baltimore NAMI affiliate in 2013.

== Ethics in psychiatry ==
He served two consecutive terms on the Ethics Committee of the American Psychiatric Association and was a member of the APA Assembly for eight years. Dr. Komrad chaired the Ethics Committee and the Ethics Consultation Service at Maryland's largest non-profit mental health care system for over 15 years. He has been very involved in the U.S. and internationally as a psychiatrist/ethicist in the issue of physician-assisted-suicide and medical euthanasia, particularly in ethical opposition to these practices—especially concerned about laws and practices permitting certain psychiatric patients to be voluntarily euthanized as is being practiced in Belgium and the Netherlands.

== Selected publications ==
- You Need Help: A Step-by-Step Plan to Convince Your Loved One to Get Counseling ISBN 978-1616491482
- "Practicing Ethically" a regular column for The Maryland Psychiatrist
- "The New CPT Codes: Ethical Challenges in a New Billing Era" Psychiatric Times, April 2014
- "Hope Springs: A New Spring in Depicting Therapists and Treatment by Hollywood?" Journal of the American Academy of Psychiatry and the Law. 2013 41(1):152-153.
- "Your Patient Just Said She is Suicidal: What do you do?" The Maryland Physician. August, 2012
- "A Dangerous Method: Ethics at the Dawn of Modern Psychiatry" Journal of the American Academy of Psychiatry and the Law, 2012, 40(2):209.
- "A defense of medical paternalism: Maximizing patients' autonomy" Journal of Medical Ethics 1983; 9: 33-44—This became a classic article in the field, republished in many textbooks of Medical Ethics and republished with a 20-year retrospective essay in Ars Medica Revista de Humanidades, November 2002

== Pubmed indexed publications ==
- Komrad MS, Federoff JP. Tricyclic click. Psychosomatics. 1990 Winter;31(1):112. PMID 2300647
- Komrad MS. Denial of the AMA-endorsed disability insurance program owing to marriage counseling. JAMA. 1989 Mar 17;261(11):1583. PMID 2918649
- Komrad MS. Electroconvulsive therapy. II: Present methods of administration. Md Med J. 1988 Apr;37(4):270. PMID 3367717
- Komrad MS. Electroconvulsive therapy. I. Indications. Md Med J. 1988 Mar;37(3):167. PMID 3357375
- Komrad MS, Coffey CE, Coffey KS, McKinnis R, Massey EW, Califf RM. Myocardial infarction and stroke. Neurology. 1984 Nov;34(11):1403-9. PMID 6493488
- Komrad MS. A defence of medical paternalism: maximising patients' autonomy. J Med Ethics. 1983 Mar;9(1):38-44. PMID 6834402
