= Vanessa Grubbs =

Nephrologist

Assistant Professor Vanessa Grubbs
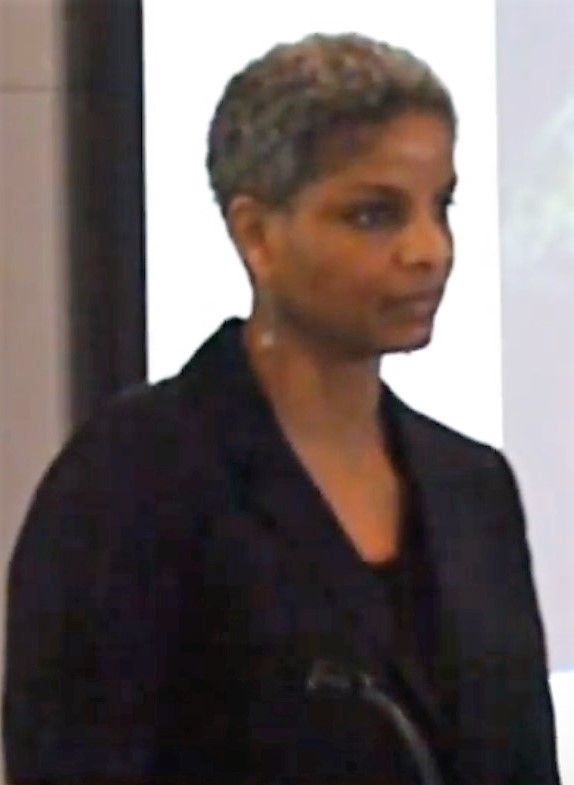
- Vanessa Grubbs speaks at Stanford Geriatric Education Center in 2015
- Born: North Carolina
- Education: Duke University; Duke University School of Medicine
- Occupation: Nephrologist
- Years active: 2009 - present
- Medical career
- Institutions: Zuckerberg San Francisco General Hospital
- Research: Nephrology

Vanessa Grubbs is a nephrologist and a writer based in Oakland, California. She is an associate professor at the University of California, San Francisco. She works at Zuckerberg San Francisco General Hospital.

== Early life and education ==
Grubbs was born in Spring Lake, North Carolina. She earned a bachelor's degree at Duke University. She remained at Duke University School of Medicine for medical school.

== Research and career ==
Grubbs joined the Alameda County Medical Center for her internal medicine residency. She completed a nephrology fellowship at UCSF School of Medicine. In 2012 she was awarded a National Institutes of Health K23 Career Development Award. She is a Harold Amos Robert Wood Johnson Foundation Medical Faculty fellow. She studied the dietary supplements of Americans that are potentially harmful in chronic kidney disease. Her research focuses on the impact of periodontal disease on kidney function. She is a member of the American Society of Nephrology and serves on the public policy board. She studied the outcomes of in-hospital palliative care consultations of patients with renal disease.

Grubbs is a non-fiction writer and leads a workshop series for senior medical students in the Program in Medical Education for the Urban Underserved. She appeared on the cover of the American Society of Nephrology magazine Renal Life in 2018.

=== Hundreds of Interlaced Fingers ===
Grubbs published her first book with Amistad in 2017. The book describes how Grubbs met her husband, Robert Phillips, who had end-stage kidney disease. Whilst searching for a kidney, Grubbs learned about the disparities in kidney allocation, where African American patients received only 1 in 5 of donated kidneys despite being 1 in 3 of transplant candidates. The book documents other biases she has experienced as a woman of colour. She donated her own kidney before getting an engagement ring. It is also a collection of medical histories that covers the 400 years in the build-up of medical dialysis. The book was well received by The New York Times and Kirkus Reviews.
