= Cheryl Overs =

Sex workers' rights activist

Cheryl Overs is a founder and former first director of the Prostitutes Collective of Victoria, the Scarlet Alliance in Australia and the Global Network of Sex Work Projects. Born in Melbourne, Australia in 1957 and educated at University High School and La Trobe University. Overs set up organisations, oversaw events and authored texts that established the place of sex workers' rights within the global response to HIV/AIDS.

== Biography ==
In 1981 Overs joined a group of feminist lawyers lobbying for decriminalisation and destigmatisation of sex work and protesting violence and discrimination against sex workers. By 1984 that group evolved into a membership based sex workers group named the Prostitutes Collective of Victoria (PCV) which was based on the English Prostitutes Collective. As first director of the PCV Overs led the successful campaign for law reform in Victoria and oversaw the development of innovative programmes for sex workers including peer education, needle and syringe exchange, and the Ugly Mugs List, a tool for preventing violence against sex workers. These were models for international adaptation and replication. In 1988 the PCV hosted the Prostitution and the Aids Debate Conference in Melbourne which led to the formation of the national federation of sex workers' organisations, the Scarlet Alliance.

After attending the International AIDS Conference in Canada in 1989 Overs moved to Europe to advocate for sex workers' rights in the nascent global response to HIV/AIDS. This included working as an advisor to the Global Program on Aids at the World Health Organization and contributing to International Aids conferences and publications such as Harvard Aids Institute's ‘Aids in the World’ She is the author of several articles and monographs that set out the sex workers' rights movement's positions on health and human rights. These include 'Making Sex Work Safe'; 'Understanding Sex Work'; 'Sex Workers, Part of the Solution' and 'Only Rights Can Stop the Wrongs' and "Sex Work and the New Era of HIV Prevention and Care'.

In 1992 Overs met Brazilian sexuality activist Paulo Henrique Longo and they founded the International Network of Sex Worker Projects (NSWP). Overs was the first director of the NSWP which was based in France before hubs were established in Brazil and South Africa. The NSWP supported new sex worker organisations, led global advocacy on sex work issues, created the first information clearing house and international discussion group on sex work and sent delegations of sex worker advocates to attend conferences and other key events such as the Beijing Women's Conference, World Social Forums and the International AIDS Conferences.

Since 2000 Overs has continued advocating for health and human rights working with various UN and civil society agencies in more than twenty countries including Ethiopia, India, UK, Bangladesh, Cambodia, Mongolia and Brazil.

In 2009 Overs joined Monash University where she contributed to the establishment of the Michael Kirby Centre for Public Health and Human Rights and she has continued working on human rights and sex work issues at Sussex University and the Institute of Development Studies where she has developed an on-line resource centre on sex work research (PLRI); published a map of sex work law, and several articles about sex work and human rights in the context of public health and development aid, LGBT rights; economic empowerment and poverty reduction for marginalised women and girls; pre exposure HIV prophylaxis and sexual citizenship.

In 2012 Overs was a member of the UNDP Technical Advisory Group of the Global Commission on HIV and the Law which recommended the decriminalisation of sex work, and delivered a plenary speech on the involvement of sex workers in HIV responses at the International Aids Conference in Washington DC.

In 2016, Overs' contribution to human rights was recognised when her portrait by the Chinese artist Ai Weiwei was exhibited with other prominent Australian human rights activists at the National Gallery Of Victoria.

== Publications ==
Overs, C. (2006) Understanding Sex Work. Asia Pacific Network of Sex Workers

Overs, C. (2008) Sex Work and the New Era of HIV Prevention and Care. Asia Pacific Network of Sex Workers

Kerrigan D; Overs, C; Telles, P; Torres, H; and Castle C. (2008) Community Development and HIV/STI Related Vulnerability Among Female Sex Workers in, Rio de Janeiro, Brazil Health Education Research.

Overs, C and Hunter, A. (2010) Making Sex Work Safe : A guide for programme managers, field workers and policy makers. Network of Sex Work Projects. UK.

Overs, C. (2011) Tackling Child Commercial Sexual Exploitation. Paulo Longo Research Initiative.

Overs, C. (2011) Treatment as Prevention: How might the game change for sex workers? Paulo Longo Research Initiative

Waldman, L. and Overs, C. (2013) Sexuality and the Law: Case Studies from Cambodia, Egypt, Nepal and South Africa Institute of Development Studies Evidence Report 49.

Overs C. (2015) Developing More Effective Strategies for Sex Work, Law and Poverty Institute of Development Studies.

Overs, C. (2016) From the Frontline in Lalor, K.; Mills, E.; Sánchez García, A. and Haste, P. Gender, Sexuality and Social Justice: What's Law Got to Do with It?, Brighton: IDS
