= Laura Niklason =

American anesthesiologist

Laura Elizabeth Niklason is a physician, professor and internationally recognized researcher in vascular and lung tissue engineering. She is the Nicholas M. Greene Professor of Anesthesiology and Biomedical Engineering at Yale University and co-founder, chief executive officer and president of Humacyte, a regenerative medicine company developing bioengineered human tissues.

Her work on lab-grown lungs was recognized as one of the top 50 most important inventions of 2010 by Time magazine. Niklason was included on Fortune’s “Digital Health Care Leaders” list in 2017 for her work in regenerative medicine.

Niklason was inducted into the National Academy of Inventors in 2014. In 2015, she was elected to the National Academy of Medicine. In 2020, Niklason was elected a member of the National Academy of Engineering for cardiovascular tissue engineering, lung regeneration, and biomedical imaging. She holds more than 40 issued or pending patents in the United States.

== Early life and education ==
Laura Niklason was born in Evanston, Ill. She earned a B.S. in physics and a B.A. in biophysics from the University of Illinois (Urbana-Champaign campus) in 1983. She holds an M.D. from the University of Michigan and a Ph.D. in biophysics from the University of Chicago. Niklason completed her medical training in anesthesiology and critical care medicine at Massachusetts General Hospital in 1996.

== Career ==
Niklason was a faculty member at Duke University from 1998 to 2005. In 2004, Niklason along with Drs. Shannon Dahl and Juliana Blum, co-founded Humacyte, a company based in Durham, North Carolina, that is pioneering the development and manufacture of off-the-shelf, universally implantable, bioengineered human tissues to improve the lives of patients and transform the practice of medicine. In 2006, Niklason joined the faculty at the Yale School of Medicine, where she currently serves as an adjunct professor of anesthesia and biomedical engineering.

In 2010, Niklason and her colleagues were able to successfully produce an engineered rat lung that could inhale and exhale carbon dioxide. In 2013, Niklason along with Duke researcher Dr. Jeffery Lawson, developed a bioengineered blood vessel, which Lawson grafted into an artery in a Duke patient's arm.

In 2016, Niklason was named as the Nicholas M. Greene Professor of Anesthesiology and Biomedical Engineering at Yale. As part of a research team, Niklason conducted clinical trials into the effectiveness of giving patients experiencing kidney failure bioengineered blood vessels.

In 2020, Niklason was appointed CEO and president of Humacyte. During Niklason's tenure, the company went public through a merger with Alpha Healthcare Acquisition Corp in 2021.

== Philanthropy ==
The Brady W. Dougan and Laura E. Niklason House at University of Chicago was named for her.

== Awards and honors ==
Niklason is the recipient of multiple awards and honors, including:

- 2021: Named one of FiercePharma's 2021 Fiercest Women in Biotech.
- 2021: Winner of Triangle Business Journal 2021 Life Sciences Award. Award went to Humacyte, Inc., of which Niklason is the founder.
- 2020: National Academy of Engineering Member
- 2017: Named to Fortune's Digital Health Care Leaders list for her work in regenerative medicine.
- 2017: Cotlove Lectureship Award in Laboratory Medicine
- 2017: Inducted into Women in Technology Hall of Fame
- 2016: Named to 2016 Disruptor 50 Companies. Award went to Humacyte, Inc., of which Niklason is the founder.
- 2015: Winner of FierceMedicalDevices 2016 Fierce 15. Award went to Humacyte, Inc., of which Niklason is the founder.
- 2014: National Academy of Inventors Fellow
- 2011: Winner of Popular Mechanics Breakthrough Innovators Award for 2011, for development of "off-the-self" tissue engineered vascular graft to treat patients with vascular disease. Award went to Humacyte, Inc., of which Niklason is the founder.
- 2011: Winner of Frost & Sullivan Growth, Innovation & Leadership Award 2011, for development of engineered vascular graft. Award went to Humacyte, Inc., of which Niklason is founder.
- 2010: 50 best inventions of 2010 (engineered lung) Time
- 2008: College of Fellows, American Institute for Medical and Biological Engineering (AIMBE)
- 2002: Beeson Physician Scholars Award, American Federation for Aging Research
- 2001: One of 21 U.S. News & World Report Innovators for 2001
- 2001: Hunt scholar, Pratt School of Engineering, Duke University
- 2000: Discover magazine award for technological innovation (finalist in the health category)
- 2000: Selected by the National Academy of Engineering for Symposium on Frontiers of Engineering
- 1999: “Eminent Scientist of the Year,” International Research Promotion Council

== Publications ==
Niklason is the co-author of more than 120 publications. A selected list follows:

- Niklason, L., Gao, J., Abbott, W.M., Hirschi, K.K., Houser, S., Marini, R., Langer, R. "Functional Arteries Grown in Vitro," Science, (1999), 5413, 489 – 493.
- Borel, C., McKee, A., Parra, A., Haglund, M., Solan, A., Prabhakar, V., Sheng, H., Warner, D., Niklason, L. "Possible Role for Vascular Cell Proliferation in Cerebral Vasospasm After Subarachnoid Hemorrhage," Stroke, (2003), 34:427-433.
- Poh, M., Boyer, M., Dahl, S., Pedrotty, D., Banik, S., McKee, J., Klinger, R., Counter, C., Niklason, L. "Blood Vessels Engineered From Human Cells," The Lancet, (2005), 366, 9489; 891–892.
- Gong, Z., Niklason, L. "Small-Diameter Human Vessel Wall Engineered From Bone Marrow-Derived Mesenchymal Stem Cells (hMSCs)," The FASEB Journal, (2008), 22:1635-1648.
- Petersen, T.H., Calle, E.A., Zhao, L., Lee, E.J., Gui, L., Raredon, M.B., Gavrilov, K., Yi, T., Zhuang, Z.W., Breuer, C., Herzog, E., Niklason, L.E. "Tissue-Engineered Lungs for In Vivo Implantation," Science, (2010), 329, 5991; 538–41.
- Dahl, S.L., Kypson, A.P., Lawson, J.H., Blum, J.L., Strader, J.T., Li, Y., Manson, R.J., Tente, W.E., DiBernardo, L., Hensley, M.T., Carter, R., Williams, T.P., Prichard, H.L., Dey, M.S., Begelman, K.G., Niklason L.E. "Readily Available Tissue-Engineered Vascular Grafts," Science Translational Medicine, (2011), 3, 68;68ra9.
- Quint, C., Kondo, Y., Manson, R.J., Lawson, J.H., Dardik, A., Niklason, L.E. Decellularized Tissue-Engineered Blood Vessel as an Arterial Conduit, Proceedings of the National Academy of Sciences of the United States of America, (2011), 108, 22; 9214–9.
- Zhou, J., Niklason, L.E., "Microfluidic Artificial 'Vessels' for Dynamic Mechanical Stimulation of Mesenchymal Stem Cells," Integrative biology: quantitative biosciences from nano to macro, (2012), 4, 12; 1487–97.
- Ghaedi, M., Calle, E.A., Mendez, J.J., Gard, A.L., Balestrini, J., Booth, A., Bove, P.F., Gui, L., White, E.S., Niklason, L.E., "Human iPS Cell-Derived Alveolar Epithelium Repopulates Lung Extracellular Matrix," The Journal of Clinical Investigation, (2013), 123, 11; 4950–62.
- Mendez, J.J., Ghaedi, M., Sivarapatna, A., Dimitrievska, S., Shao, Z., Osuji, C.O., Steinbacher, D.M., Leffell, D.J., Niklason, L.E., "Mesenchymal Stromal Cells form Vascular Tubes When Placed in Fibrin Sealant and Accelerate Wound Healing In Vivo," Biomaterials, (2014).
- Raredon, M.S., Niklason, L.E., "A Call to Craft," Science Translational Medicine, (2014), 6(218):218fs1.
- Gutowski, P., Gage, S.m., Guziewicz, M., Ilzecki, M. Kazimierczak, A., Kirkton, R.D., Niklason, L.E., Pilgrim, A., Prichard, H.L., Przywara, S., Samad, R., Tente, B., Turek, J., Witkiewicz, W., Zapotoczny, N., Zubilewicz, T., Lawson, J.H., "Arterial reconstruction with human bioengineered acellular blood vessels in patients with peripheral arterial disease," Journal of Vascular Surgery, (2020), 72(4):1247-1258.
- Niklason, L.E., Lawson, J.H., "Bioengineered human blood vessels," Science, (2020), 9;370(6513):eaaw8682.
