= Barbara Dudley Alexander =

American infectious disease physician

Barbara Dudley Alexander is an American infectious disease physician. She is a professor of medicine and pathology at the Duke University School of Medicine.

Alexander earned an M.D. at ECU Brody School of Medicine in 1993. She completed a residency in medicine at Duke University. She conducted fellowships in infectious diseases and medical microbiology at Duke University. Alexander was president of the Infectious Diseases Society of America.
