= PeerForward =

Nonprofit organization in Washington D.C., United States

PeerForward, formerly College Summit, is a national nonprofit organization focused on supporting low-income students in accessing college and career pathways. In high schools across the nation, PeerForward trains and deploys teams of selected juniors and seniors to encourage peers to complete college-related milestones.

== History ==
In 1993, Keith Frome, J.B. Schramm and Derek Canty started a teen education center in the basement of a community center in low-income in Washington, D.C., working with students who had the intelligence, resiliency, and grit to succeed in college and careers, but did not know how to pursue post-secondary education. Through this program, they witnessed firsthand the transformative influence that one student could have on pushing their friends toward higher education. In 1996, they established College Summit Incorporated, which now operates as PeerForward, based on a fundamental question: "Who is the most influential person to a 17-year-old?" Their answer: "Another 17-year-old."

In 2015, College Summit received a preliminary version of a five-year study they had commissioned from the American Institutes for Research. The report found no difference in college enrollment between participating and nonparticipating schools, suggesting that the program had little impact. In response, the organization rebranded itself as PeerForward and changed some aspects of the program, including reducing the fees charged to participating schools.

A Stanford Social Innovation Review essay, "Cutting Costs to Increase Impact," analyzed these changes. In the 2017–18 school year, 114 teams of influential 11th- and 12th-graders trained by PeerForward mobilized to run campaigns (events, peer-to-peer coaching, awareness) to reach 110,000 of their classmates and peers. Independent researchers from the University of Pittsburgh found that PeerForward high schools had a 26% higher rate of Free Application for Federal Student Aid (FAFSA) completion compared to similar schools without the program. The effect resulted in an estimated $13 million more in grants and scholarships available to pay for school. However, there is as yet no evidence that PeerForward is increasing college enrollment.
