= Joanne Kurtzberg =

American pediatric transplant specialist

- Education: New York University
- Scientific career
- Workplaces: Duke University School of Medicine

Joanne Kurtzberg is an American professor of pediatrics and pathology at Duke University.

== Education ==
Kurtzberg completed her medical education at New York University in 1976.

== Career ==
Kurtzberg is a professor and researcher at the Duke University School of Medicine. She researches cord blood transplants in children with cerebral palsy or neonatal brain injuries. Dr. Joanne Kurtzberg was Medical and Scientific Advisory Board Member for Americord and an advisor to Cryo-Cell.

== Selected works ==
=== Journal articles ===
- Gluckman, Eliane; Broxmeyer, Hal E.; Auerbach, Arleen D.; Friedman, Henry S.; Douglas, Gordon W.; Devergie, Agnès; Esperou, Hélène; Thierry, Dominique; Socie, Gérard; Lehn, Pierre; Cooper, Scott; English, Denis; Kurtzberg, Joanne; Bard, Judith; Boyse, Edward A. (1989). "Hematopoietic Reconstitution in a Patient with Fanconi's Anemia by Means of Umbilical-Cord Blood from an HLA-Identical Sibling". New England Journal of Medicine. 321 (17): 1174–1178. doi:10.1056/nejm198910263211707. PMID 2571931.
- Rubinstein, Pablo; Carrier, Carmelita; Scaradavou, Andromachi; Kurtzberg, Joanne; Adamson, John; Migliaccio, Anna Ritá; Berkowitz, Richard L.; Cabbad, Michael; Dobrila, N. Ludy; Taylor, Patricia E.; Rosenfield, Richard E.; Stevens, Cladd E. (1998). "Outcomes among 562 Recipients of Placental-Blood Transplants from Unrelated Donors". New England Journal of Medicine. 339 (22): 1565–1577. doi:10.1056/nejm199811263392201.
