= Clement Finch =

American physician

- Born: Clement Alfred Finch; July 4, 1915; Broadalbin, New York, U.S.
- Died: June 28, 2010 (aged 94); La Jolla, San Diego, California, U.S.
- Education: Union College; University of Rochester
- Known for: First chief of hematology at University of Washington
- Scientific career
- Fields: Hematology
- Workplaces: University of Washington
- Notable students: Eloise Giblett

Clement Alfred Finch (July 4, 1915 – June 28, 2010) was an American physician specializing in hematology whose research on iron metabolism in the bloodstream at the University of Washington led to significant advancements in accurately diagnosing and treating anemia during a time period in which little was known about this aspect of the body. Finch was distinctively noted for using himself as a test subject by taking blood and bone marrow from his own bones before conducting similar tests on patients. He graduated in 1941 from the University of Rochester Medical School and a year later was married to the first of three wives. He experienced a 60-year tenure at the University of Washington, and has published many scholarly articles pertaining to iron in the bloodstream and is the author of three books entitled: Iron Metabolism (1962), Red Cell Manual (1969) and Fulfilling the Dream: A History of the University of Washington School of Medicine 1946 to 1988 (1990). Finch was elected as a Fellow of the National Academy of Sciences in 1974, and elected as a Fellow of the American Academy of Arts and Sciences in 1976.

Finch's studies are importantly recognized as significant in helping the World Health Organization make dietary recommendations for developing countries to aid in preventing anemia and poor development.

== Early life ==
Finch was born in Broadalbin, New York, on July 4, 1915, into a line of physicians which included both his father and grandfather. Having accompanied his father on many occasions to house calls, he decided to follow in his father and grandfather's footsteps. Finch graduated from Union College in 1936 and enrolled at the University of Rochester Medical School in the late 1930s, from which he worked with Nobel Prize-winner George Whipple and published his first paper on hemoglobin regeneration in dogs in the Journal of Experimental Medicine as a second-year student. He was a third-generation physician in his family. Finch married three times and had two divorces. After the University of Rochester Medical School, Finch accepted a fellowship with Joe Ross at Boston University. Ross is responsible for introducing Finch to academic medicine, collaborating on work on iron metabolism and blood preservation which was relevant to the political setting of the time with the nation at war. Finch conducted post-graduate work at Brigham and Women's Hospital in Boston, working with acclaimed physicians such as Soma Weiss, Eugene A. Stead and Charles Janeway. In 1948 after not being able to join the military due to pneumonia, Finch started his career at the University of Washington, which he preferred for the landscape and surrounding environment which offered him access to his favorite hobbies such as mountain climbing. One year later in 1949, he became University of Washington's first Chief of Hematology.

== Research ==
Finch's research on how iron metabolizes in the blood helped with blood disorders characterized by either an excess or inadequate supply of iron in the blood stream, such as anemia and hemochromatosis, and also focused his work on further understanding erythropoiesis, a process by which red blood cells are produced. During a period in which little was known about iron-deficiency anemia, how often it occurred or the principles of iron metabolism, Finch made significant findings in his research at the University of Washington throughout his 60-year tenure using radioisotopes to measure the body's production of red cells and their life span. He was able to discover how iron is incorporated in hemoglobin, and was able to aid doctors in expanding their abilities from simply detecting iron-deficiency anemia to detecting different types of anemia in an increasingly accurate manner. Finch has published Scientific Journal articles specifically pertaining to Erythropoiesis and anemia such as Erythropoiesisin Pernicious Anemia (1953), Treatment of Iron Deficiency Anemia in the Adult (1957), The Diagnosing of Iron deficiency Anemia (1964), Pathophysiologic Aspects of Sickle Cell Anemia (1972), and Erythroid Marrow Function in Anemic Patients (1987). Additional articles included: The Effect of Erythroid Hyperplasia on iron balance (1988), and Intact Transferrin Receptors in Human Plasma and Their Relation to Erythropoisis in blood (1990).

Transferrin, a blood plasma protein for iron ion delivery, was a topic for Finch in the 1980s. He researched and published studies on transferrin in the blood such as intact transferrin receptors in human plasma, human deferric transferrin's interaction with reticulocytes, the uptake and release of iron in human transferrin, rat transferrin and gene expression, the iron binding sites of human transferrin, its saturation, and clinical implications.

Other studies conducted by Finch showed how iron is used in the blood to manufacture hemoglobin. He additionally showed that hemochromatosis which causes the body to absorb too much iron from food consumption could be treated through periodic bleeding. He described how the body tries to maintain adequate stores after significant iron stores are depleted during menstruation and recommended that most women take supplements to prevent them from suffering signs of iron deficiency such as fatigue. He showed how to extend the life of blood stored to transfuse injured soldiers, work inspired by his desire to help serve his country after being unable to serve in the military.

Research in the early 1960s by Finch showed that most women were not getting enough iron in their diet and suggested that supplements be taken by women to avoid problems such as fatigue caused by iron deficiency.

== Death ==
Finch died on June 28, 2010, at his home in the La Jolla neighborhood of San Diego at the age of 94 and is survived by his wife Genia Finch, two children from his first marriage, Clifton Finch and Carin Finch Barber, two children from his third marriage, Lisa Finch and Derel Finch, and three grandchildren, LiLi Finch, Oliver Finch, and Samuel Finch.

== Publications ==
- Finch, Clement A. (1969). Red Cell Manual. Seattle: University of Washington. OCLC 11196233.
  - 7th ed, F.A. Davis, 1996, ISBN 0-8036-0145-X.
- Finch, Clement A. (1990). Fulfilling the Dream: A History of the University of Washington School of Medicine, 1946–1988. Seattle: Medical Alumni Association. ISBN 9780803646339. OCLC 22870961.
- Skarberg, Karl; Eng, Mary; Huebers, Helmut; Marsaglia, George; Finch, Clement (1978). "Plasma radioiron kinetics in man: explanation for the effect of plasma iron concentration". Proceedings of the National Academy of Sciences. 75 (3): 1559–1561. Bibcode:1978PNAS...75.1559S. doi:10.1073/pnas.75.3.1559. JSTOR 68042. PMC 411513. PMID 274740.
- Huebers, Helmut; Csiba, Eva; Josephson, Betty; Huebers, Eiko; Finch, Clement (1981). "Interaction of Human Diferric Transferrin with Reticulocytes". Proceedings of the National Academy of Sciences. 78 (1): 621–625. Bibcode:1981PNAS...78..621H. doi:10.1073/pnas.78.1.621. JSTOR 10098. PMC 319106. PMID 6264452.
- Huebers, Helmut; Josephson, Betty; Huebers, Eiko; Csiba, Eva; Finch, Clement (1981). "Uptake and Release of Iron from Human Transferrin". Proceedings of the National Academy of Sciences. 78 (4): 2572–2576. Bibcode:1981PNAS...78.2572H. doi:10.1073/pnas.78.4.2572. JSTOR 10221. PMC 319391. PMID 6941310.
- Huebers, Helmut; Csiba, Eva; Huebers, Eiko; Finch, Clement (1983). "Competitive Advantage of Diferric Transferrin in Delivering Iron to Reticulocytes". Proceedings of the National Academy of Sciences. 80 (1): 300–304. Bibcode:1983PNAS...80..300H. doi:10.1073/pnas.80.1.300. JSTOR 13372. PMC 393361. PMID 6572005.
- Idzerda, Rejean L.; Huebers, Helmut; Finch, Clement A.; McKnight, G. Stanley (1986). "Rat Transferrin Gene Expression: Tissue-Specific Regulation by Iron Deficiency". Proceedings of the National Academy of Sciences. 83 (11): 3723–3727. Bibcode:1986PNAS...83.3723I. doi:10.1073/pnas.83.11.3723. JSTOR 27758. PMC 323595. PMID 3459151.
- Huebers, Helmut; Josephson, Betty; Huebers, Eiko; Csiba, Eva; Finch, Clement (1984). "Occupancy of the Iron Binding Sites of Human Transferrin". Proceedings of the National Academy of Sciences. 81 (14): 4326–4330. Bibcode:1984PNAS...81.4326H. doi:10.1073/pnas.81.14.4326. JSTOR 24260. PMC 345581. PMID 6589596.
- Pirzio-Biroli, G.; Finch, Clement A. (1957). "Treatment of iron deficiency anemia in the adult". Journal of Chronic Diseases. 6 (4–5): 302–306. doi:10.1016/0021-9681(57)90025-5. PMID 13475435.
- Coleman, Daniel H.; Clement A. Finch (1953). "Erythropoiesis in pernicious anemia". American Journal of Medicine. 15 (3): 412. doi:10.1016/0002-9343(53)90104-1.
- Bainton, Dorothy Ford; Clement A. Finch (1964). "The diagnosis of iron deficiency anemia". American Journal of Medicine. 37 (1): 62–70. doi:10.1016/0002-9343(64)90212-8. PMID 14181150.
- Body iron excretion in man: A collaborative study

The American Journal of Medicine, Volume 45, Issue 3, September 1968, Pages 336-353
Ralph Green, Robert Charlton, Harold Seftel, Thomas Bothwell, Fatima Mayet, Barry Adams, Clement Finch, Miguel Layrisse

- Evaluation of storage iron by chelates

The American Journal of Medicine, Volume 45, Issue 1, July 1968, Pages 105-115
Laurence A. Harker, Donald D. Funk, Clement A. Finch

- Iron stores in man

The American Journal of Medicine, Volume 11, Issue 5, November 1951, Page 629
Alexander R. Stevens Jr., Clement A. Finch

- Iron storage disease

Journal of Chronic Diseases, Volume 2, Issue 2, August 1955, Pages 232-233
Clement A. Finch

- Clinical syndrome of potassium intoxication

The American Journal of Medicine, Volume 1, Issue 4, October 1946, Pages 337-352
Clement A. Finch, C.Glenn Sawyer, John M. Flynn

- Pathophysiologic aspects of sickle cell anemia

The American Journal of Medicine, Volume 53, Issue 1, July 1972, Pages 1-6
Clement A. Finch

- Effects of iron status on δ-aminolevulinic acid dehydratase activity

Biochemical Medicine, Volume 18, Issue 3, December 1977, Pages 323-329
Robert F. Labbé, Clement A. Finch

- Intact transferrin receptors in human plasma and their relation to erythropoiesis

Blood, Jan 1990; 75: 102 – 107. HA Huebers, Y Beguin, P Pootrakul, D Einspahr, and CA Finch

- Quantitation of ferritin iron in plasma, an explanation for non- transferrin iron

Blood, Apr 1988; 71: 1120 - 1123. P Pootrakul, B Josephson, HA Huebers, and CA Finch

- The effect of erythroid hyperplasia on iron balance

Blood, Apr 1988; 71: 1124 - 1129. P Pootrakul, K Kitcharoen, P Yansukon, P Wasi, S Fucharoen, P Charoenlarp, G Brittenham, MJ Pippard, and CA Finch

- Erythroid marrow function in anemic patients

Blood, Jan 1987; 69: 296 – 301. M Cazzola, P Pootrakul, HA Huebers, M Eng, J Eschbach, and CA Finch

- Transferrin saturation, plasma iron turnover, and transferrin uptake in normal humans

Blood, Oct 1985; 66: 935 - 939. M Cazzola, HA Huebers, MH Sayers, AP MacPhail, M Eng, and CA Finch

- A mono-sited transferrin from a representative deuterostome: the ascidian Pyura stolonifera (subphylum Urochordata)

AW Martin, E Huebers, H Huebers, J Webb, and CA Finch
Blood, Nov 1984; 64: 1047 - 1052.

- Transferrin: physiologic behavior and clinical implications

HA Huebers and CA Finch
Blood, Oct 1984; 64: 763 - 767.

- The significance of transferrin for intestinal iron absorption

HA Huebers, E Huebers, E Csiba, W Rummel, and CA Finch
Blood, Feb 1983; 61: 283 - 290.

- Ferrioxamine excretion in iron-loaded man

MJ Pippard, ST Callender, and CA Finch
Blood, Aug 1982; 60: 288 - 294.
