= Latin American Youth Center =

NGO in Washington D.C., US

Latin American Youth Center (LAYC) is an American non-governmental organization in the Washington DC metropolitan area. It was founded in 1968 by a group of first-generation Latino immigrant youth and incorporated into a 501(c)(3) organization in 1974. Initially created to empower Latino youth, it later expanded its mission to include youth of all races with the aim of empowering young people and their families to "achieve a successful transition to adulthood through multi-cultural, comprehensive and innovative programs that address youths' social, academic and career needs."

== Population served ==
Each year, LAYC serves more than 4,200 youth (ages 0-26) of all racial and socioeconomic backgrounds. It runs 45+ programs through a network of youth centers, schools, and public charter schools. Its primary goal is to provide young people the support they need to successfully transition into adulthood through comprehensive programming.

In 2016, DC approved the Ending Youth Homelessness Act and created two drop-in centers; one of them, in Columbia Heights (a few blocks from Columbia Heights station) is managed by LAYC. Youth can go during daytime to take a shower, eat a meal, wash their clothes and study for GED tests without any appointment. Regardless or their appearance or state of sobriety, they will receive substance abuse counseling, HIV testing, mental-health care, and housing referrals.

LAYC offers multi-lingual, culturally sensitive programs focusing on Educational Enhancement, Workforce Investment, Social Services, Art + Media, and Advocacy.

LAYC also provides a bilingual residential facility for teen parents.

== Budget ==
LAYC is supported by the District of Columbia, and two Maryland counties - Prince George and Montgomery. It also receives fundraising from individual donors, corporate donors and foundations, donor advised funds, and other generous philanthropic organizations. In 2021 LAYC's budget was US$15,185,070. The A&T Foundation is one of its sponsors.

== Program services ==
LAYC programs focus on housing, social services, community wellness, education, workforce investment and social enterprise, arts and media programs, among others.

The LAYC Career Academy is a program to support and provide resources for young people to study for their GED certificate or to help them enter a career of their choosing.

== See also ==
- Office of Latino Affairs of the District of Columbia
- Hispanics in Washington, D.C.
- General Educational Development
- Mayor of the District of Columbia
- Hispanic and Latino Americans
- Arts and culture of Washington, D.C.
- GALA Hispanic Theatre
