= C. Thomas Caskey =

American geneticist (1938–2022)

- Born: September 12, 1938; Lancaster, South Carolina, U.S.
- Died: January 13, 2022 (aged 83)
- Education: University of South Carolina; Duke University
- Awards: William Allan Award (2021)
- Scientific career
- Fields: Biomedical genetics
- Workplaces: Baylor College of Medicine

External videos
- 2021 William Allan Award, American Society of Human Genetics, 2021.

Charles Thomas Caskey (September 12, 1938 – January 13, 2022), also known as C. Thomas Caskey, was an American internist who has been a medical Geneticist and biomedical researcher and entrepreneur. He was a Professor of Molecular and Human Genetics at Baylor College of Medicine, and served as editor of the Annual Review of Medicine from 2001 to 2019. He was a member of the editorial boards of the Proceedings of the National Academy of Sciences, Science, the Encyclopedia of Molecular Medicine and numerous other medical and scientific journals.

== Education ==
Caskey attended the University of South Carolina (1956–58) and Duke University Medical School (1958–63). He was a student biochemical fellow (1961–62) with James B. Wyngaarden, a pioneer in the study of the biochemical basis of metabolic disease. Caskey received his M.D. degree in 1963 and completed internship and residency in the Department of Medicine (1963–65).

== Career ==
Caskey trained at National Institutes of Health (NIH) (1965 -1971) where he was a research associate at the National Heart and Lung Institute (NHLI) with Nobel Prize-winner Marshall Nirenberg. Caskey then became senior investigator, Laboratory of Biochemical Genetics (1967–70) and head, Section of Medical Genetics at NHLI (1970–71). He is credited with discovery of the universality of the genetic code and its start and stop punctuation mechanisms (NIH, Health Molecular Biology Award). As an Advisor to National Aeronautics and Space Administration (NASA)'s Mars Mission, Caskey was involved in exploring this "universality" in a broader space context.

In 1971, Caskey left NIH to found the Department of Molecular and Human Genetics at Baylor College of Medicine in Houston, Texas, where he served as Chairman for the next two decades. At Baylor he served as Chief, Section of Medical Genetics (1971–85) and Professor of Medicine and Biochemistry (1971–94). From 1976 to 1994 Caskey was an Investigator at the Howard Hughes Medical Institute at Baylor. While on sabbatical leave from Baylor in 1979–80, Caskey was a Faculty Scholar at the Cambridge University Medical Research Council unit with another Nobel Prize-winner Sydney Brenner. He has trained 67 Post-Doctoral Fellows and 25 Doctoral graduates. He has published 480 academic papers.

In 1994 Caskey left academia to become senior vice president for research at Merck Pharmaceuticals and Vaccines. He was trustee and president of The Merck Genome Research Institute at the Merck Research Laboratories in Sumneytown Pike, West Point, Pennsylvania.

Caskey has had a long engagement with medical science in other countries, notably Canada, Mexico and China. From 2002 to 2009 he was a member of the Board of Genome Canada and from 2009 to 2012 he served as Chair of that organization. During his tenure, Genome Canada discovered the SARS Virus and was first to establish the undiagnosed disease program of children. For his service to genomics research in Canada he was made a Fellow of the Academy of Science of the Royal Society of Canada in 2010.

Casked served as director of the Joint Postdoctoral Program between the University of Texas Health Science Center at Houston and Facultad de Medicina y Hospital Universitario de la Universidad Autonoma de Nuevo León and continues to serve as a member of the Scientific Commission to Prevent Epidemic and Emergency Health Issues in Nuevo León. For his service to biotechnology development in Mexico be received the Governor of Nuevo León Award for Cooperation in Education and Investigation (2009) and the "Flame of Truth" award for backing up biotechnology's development in Mexico (2014).

In recent years, his work has also involved cooperation with biomedical researchers in the Taizhou Cardiovascular R&D Centre and the Guangzhou Institute of Biomedicine and Health (GIBH), Chinese Academy of Sciences.

Over a period of more than 30 years, Caskey has served as a member or chair of the scientific advisory boards of more than a dozen bio-medical corporations, largely focused on human genetics and related gene therapies for muscular dystrophy and other neuro-muscular diseases. He was a Fellow of the American Society of Microbiology, the American Association for the Advancement of Science, the American College of Medical Geneticsthe American College of Physicians and the Royal Society of Canada. From 1990 to 1991 he served as president of the American Society of Human Genetics, President of the Human Genome Organization (1988-1990) and in 2004–05, President of the Academy of Medicine, Engineering and Science of Texas.

In the United States, Caskey has served on advisory boards and review panels for the National Institutes of Health and the Food & Drug Administration, and internationally as a special advisor to the World Health Organization (WHO) Hereditary Diseases Program, and as a member of the WHO's Expert Advisory Panel on Human Genetics.

In 2000, Caskey returned to Houston as founding director and CEO of Cogene Biotech Ventures and Cogene Ventures, venture capital funds designed to support early-stage biotechnology and life sciences companies using genome technology for drug discovery.

In 2006, Caskey was appointed director and CEO-elect of the Brown Foundation Institute of Molecular Medicine for the Prevention of Human Diseases, part of the University of Texas Health Science Center at Houston, where he created the Texas Therapeutics Institute.

In 2019, Caskey took up a new role as Chief Medical Officer of Human Longevity, a medical technology company based in San Diego, using artificial intelligence to prevent diseases associated with aging.

== External links and sources ==
- Curriculum Vitae of Caskey on the website of Identigene
- C. Thomas Caskey Will Direct Brown Foundation Institute of Molecular Medicine, announcement by UT Health Science Center
