= Barton Haynes =

American physician and immunologist

Barton F. Haynes is an American physician and scientist who is known for work on basic biology of the immune system and on HIV vaccine development. An infectious disease specialist, Haynes is the founding director of the Duke Human Vaccine Institute (DHVI) and since 2005, has been an international leader in the effort to develop an HIV vaccine. He led the team that first induced HIV broadly reactive neutralizing antibody lineages in humans with a vaccine. He has performed work on HIV-host interactions that have led to strategies for HIV vaccine development and, more generally, concepts for engineering the B cell arm of the immune system. Haynes' team played an active role in the response to COVID-19 by developing a vaccine for new animal coronaviruses.

== Education ==
Haynes attended the University of Tennessee and then Baylor College of Medicine, graduating in 1973. He received training in internal medicine at Duke University and then from 1975 - 1980 Haynes was in the Public Health Service stationed at the National Institutes of Allergy and Infectious Diseases at the National Institutes of Health. Haynes received fellowship training in infectious diseases at the NIH and the National Naval Medical Center and in allergy and clinical immunology at the NIH and the Walter Reed Army Medical Center.

== Career ==
In 1980, Haynes became an Associate Professor of Medicine at Duke in the Division of Rheumatology and Immunology, became Professor of Medicine in 1986, and received the Frederic M. Hanes Distinguished Professorship of Medicine in 1988. In 1987 he became Chief of Rheumatology and Immunology at Duke, in 1990, he became the founding director of the Duke Human Vaccine Institute, in 1995 he became Chair of the Duke Department of Medicine and served from 2000-2002 as Chief of Staff of Duke Hospital. In 2002, he stepped down from department chair to devote full time to laboratory research and building DHVI.

== Discoveries in human immunology ==
Barton Haynes has contributed to understanding the development and biology of the human T cells and the thymus from which T lymphocytes originate. Beginning in the late 1970s, with Anthony Fauci and George Eisenbarth at NIH, he discovered the immune cell molecules CD7 and CD98, and at Duke with his team identified antibodies against CD165 and CD166 immune molecules and was a co-discoverer of CD44 human leukocyte molecules. In 1982, Haynes was a member of the organizing committee of the first human leukocyte differentiation workshop that originated the CD classification of immune cell surface proteins. Haynes went on to describe that postnatal thymus would grow in immunodeficient mice and developed with Kay Singer the methods to grow human thymic epithelial cells. Haynes and Louise Markert at Duke developed the ability to grow intact human thymus tissue that when implanted in children born without a thymus (DiGeorge Syndrome) enabled T cell reconstitution and enabled curative thymic transplantation for babies born without a thymus (DiGeorge syndrome). Haynes described two types of natural antibodies called Fab Dimerized Glycan (FDG) antibodies that neutralize multiple virus types and HLA-E-VL9 antibodies that enhance NK and T cell cytotoxicity.

== HTLV-1 ==
In 1983, Haynes isolated the human retrovirus, human T cell leukemia/lymphoma virus-1 (HTLV-1), from the blood and skin from a person with arthritis and showed the presence of HTLV-1 in joint cells, the first report of HTLV-1-induced arthritis.

== HIV-1 vaccine development ==
After Haynes work on HTLV-1, in 1982 Haynes joined the working group at the NIH led by Robert Gallo to determine the cause of the new disease that became known as AIDS. As soon as HIV-1 was discovered and then shown to be the cause of AIDS, Haynes began his work on developing an HIV-1 vaccine. Haynes first vaccine, developed with Thomas Palker, was a peptide vaccine designed to induce antibodies to the V3 loop of the HIV-1 envelope. This HIV vaccine candidate was manufactured by Wyeth-Lederle-Praxis and taken into the clinic as DATRI 010 and AVEG 020, worked to induce V3 loop neutralizing antibodies for laboratory HIV strains but was not effective in neutralizing HIV-1 primary isolates. In 2005, the NIAID awarded to Haynes the first of three large consortia grants dedicated to developing a vaccine for HIV-1, the Center for HIV/AIDS Vaccine Immunology (CHAVI) (funded from 2005-2012). The CHAVI defined the host-virus interactions during acute HIV-1 infection and discovered major roadblocks to inducing very broadly reactive neutralizing antibodies. In 2012, Haynes was awarded a Center for HIV/AIDS Vaccine Immunology-Immunogen Discovery (CHAVI-ID) to continue HIV vaccine development. From 2012-2019, the Duke CHAVI-ID demonstrated the co-evolution of HIV and the B cell lineages of broadly neutralizing antibodies as they developed. From this work came the observation that broadly neutralizing antibody precursors required naïve B cell or germline triggering by a form of Env, and then require sequentially mutated envelop immunogens to select for antibody B cell lineage members with broad neutralization activity. In 2019, a Consortia for HIV/AIDS Vaccine Development (CHAVD) grant was awarded to Haynes. In this grant, Haynes and his team designed a series of vaccine candidates and began testing them in humans to overcome the virus-host roadblocks that prevent the induction of protective antibodies.

== HVTN 133 clinical trial ==
The HVTN 133 vaccine, called the MPER peptide-liposome, for the first time induced heterologous neutralizing antibody memory B cell lineages in humans.. This study demonstrated that the unusual antibodies that give rise to certain broadly neutralizing antibodies can be induced and proved that the development of protective antibodies that normally take years to develop, can be induced quickly with a vaccine —both observations key to demonstrating that an HIV-1 vaccine may be possible to develop.

== Duke Human Vaccine Institute and the Duke Regional Biocontainment Laboratory ==
The mission of the Duke Human Vaccine Institute is to perform the scientific work on that society needs but may not be ready for development by industry. The areas of immune countermeasure development for DHVI now focus on building platforms for countermeasure development for pandemic preparedness for emerging and re-emerging infectious diseases.

An integral part of the DHVI is the Duke Regional Biocontainment Laboratory (RBL) funded by a grant from NIH, NIAID submitted by Haynes in 2003. Capable of safely performing experiments on infectious agents under BSL-3 conditions, the Duke RBL played a major role in DHVI's response to the COVID-19 pandemic and the current response to H5N1 influenza.

== Career milestones ==
- Chief, Division of Rheumatology and Clinical Immunology
- Frederic M. Hanes Distinguished Professor of Medicine
- Professor of Integrative Immunobiology
- Chair, Department of Medicine
- Chief of Staff, Duke Hospital
- Founding Director, Duke Human Vaccine Institute

== Awards and honors ==
- American Society of Clinical Investigation, 1983
- Distinguished Investigator Award, National American Federation for Clinical Research, 1986
- Association of American Physicians, 1988
- Lee Howley, Sr. Prize in Basic Research from the Arthritis Foundation, 1995
- National Academy of Medicine, October 1997
- Distinguished Investigator Award, American College of Rheumatology, October 2000
- Institute for Scientific Information; "100 Most Highly Cited Immunologists," 2001, 2002, 2003
- American Academy of Arts and Sciences, 2007
- Alexander Fleming Award from Infectious Disease Society of America, October 2011
- AAI-Steinman Award for Human Immunology Research, 2013
- National Academy of Inventors, 2016
- BIAL Award in Biomedicine 2021
- William Anylan Lifetime Achievement Award from the Duke School of Medicine Alumni Association, 2024

== Barton F. Haynes ==
Born: July 13, 1947 (Age 78)

Nationality: American

Education:
University of Tennessee, BS
Baylor College of Medicine, MD
Duke University Hospital, Duke University School of Medicine, House Staff

Occupation: Physician, Scientist

Known for: Human Immunology, Thymus transplantation, and HIV vaccine development

Websites:
https://dhvi.duke.edu/
https://www.linkedin.com/in/barton-haynes-67a38817b/
