= Center for Scientific Review =

CSR Logo

The Center for Scientific Review (CSR) is the portal for United States National Institutes of Health (NIH) grant applications and their review for scientific merit. The CSR organizes the peer review groups or study sections that evaluate the majority (76%) of the research grant applications sent to NIH. It also receives all grant applications for NIH, as well as for some other components of the United States Department of Health and Human Services (DHHS). Since 1946, its mission has remained clear and timely: to see that NIH grant applications receive fair, independent, expert, and timely reviews—free from inappropriate influences—so NIH can fund the most promising research.

CSR receives nearly 80,000 applications a year and recruits over 19,000 external experts to review its portion of them in its study sections, which often meet three times during the year. Additional scientists serve on other NIH advisory councils, which provide a second level of peer review and make funding recommendations based on priorities set by the United States Congress, DHHS, and the public.

From 1946 to 1997, the CSR was known as the Division of Research Grants (DRG).

== Directors ==
Past directors from 1946 - present

No.	Portrait	Director	Took office	Left office	Refs.
1		Cassius James Van Slyke	January 1946	December 1, 1959	
2		David E. Price MD	1948	1950	
3		Ernest M. Allen	1951	1960	
4		Dale R. Lindsay	1960	1963	
5		Eugene A. Confrey	October 1963	1969	
6		Stephen P. Hatchett	May 1969	August 22, 1976	
acting		Carl D. Douglass	August 1976	April 1977	
7		Carl D. Douglass	April 1977	May 3, 1985	
8		Jerome G. Green	January 1986	June 1, 1995	
9		Ellie Ehrenfeld	January 1, 1997	September 30, 2003	
acting		Brent Stanfield	October 1, 2003	June 30, 2005	
10		Antonio Scarpa	July 1, 2005	September 2, 2011	
acting		Richard K. Nakamura	September 18, 2011	December 3, 2012	
11		Richard K. Nakamura	December 3, 2012	April 30, 2018	
12		Noni Byrnes	February 14, 2019	Present	

== Current initiatives ==
- Shorten the review process so applicants can revise and resubmit their applications in the next review round if necessary and NIH can more timely fund the best research. Shortening the review process by 45 days could thus reduce the time to resubmit by four months.
- Recruit and retain the best reviewers so NIH and applicants receive the best advice.
- Foster a culture more favorable to innovative applications, so that NIH can fund research that promises larger advances in science and health.
- Address the concern that clinical research is not properly evaluated, so this important research is well represented in the NIH program.
- Increase the transparency, accountability, and uniformity of NIH peer review.

== See also ==
- United States Department of Health and Human Services
- NIH grant
- grant (money)
