= Salvadoran diaspora in Los Angeles =

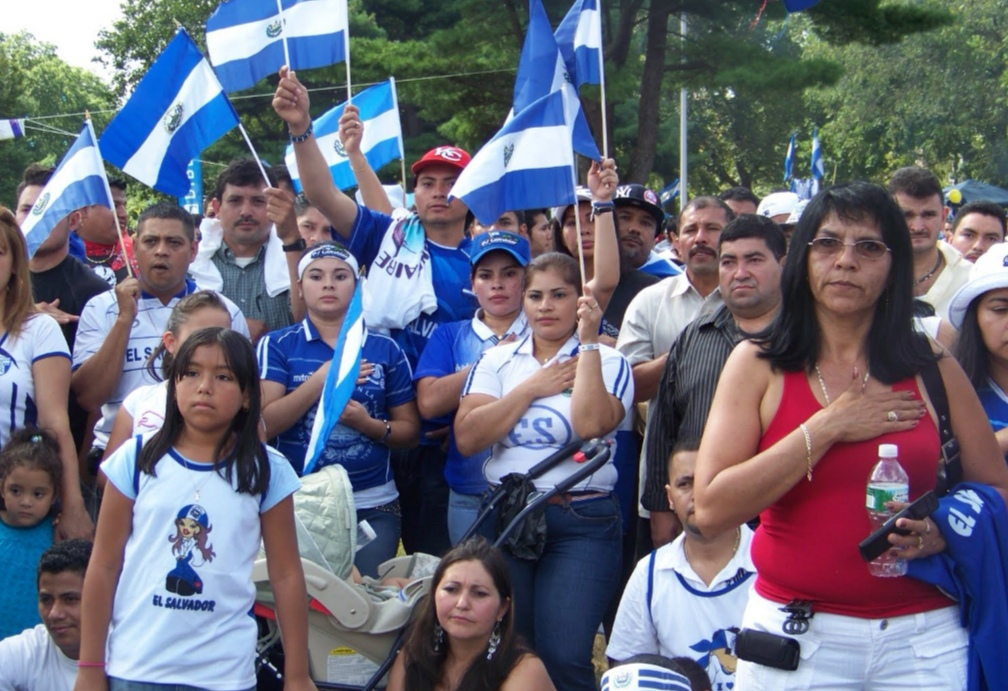
Salvadorans in Los Angeles

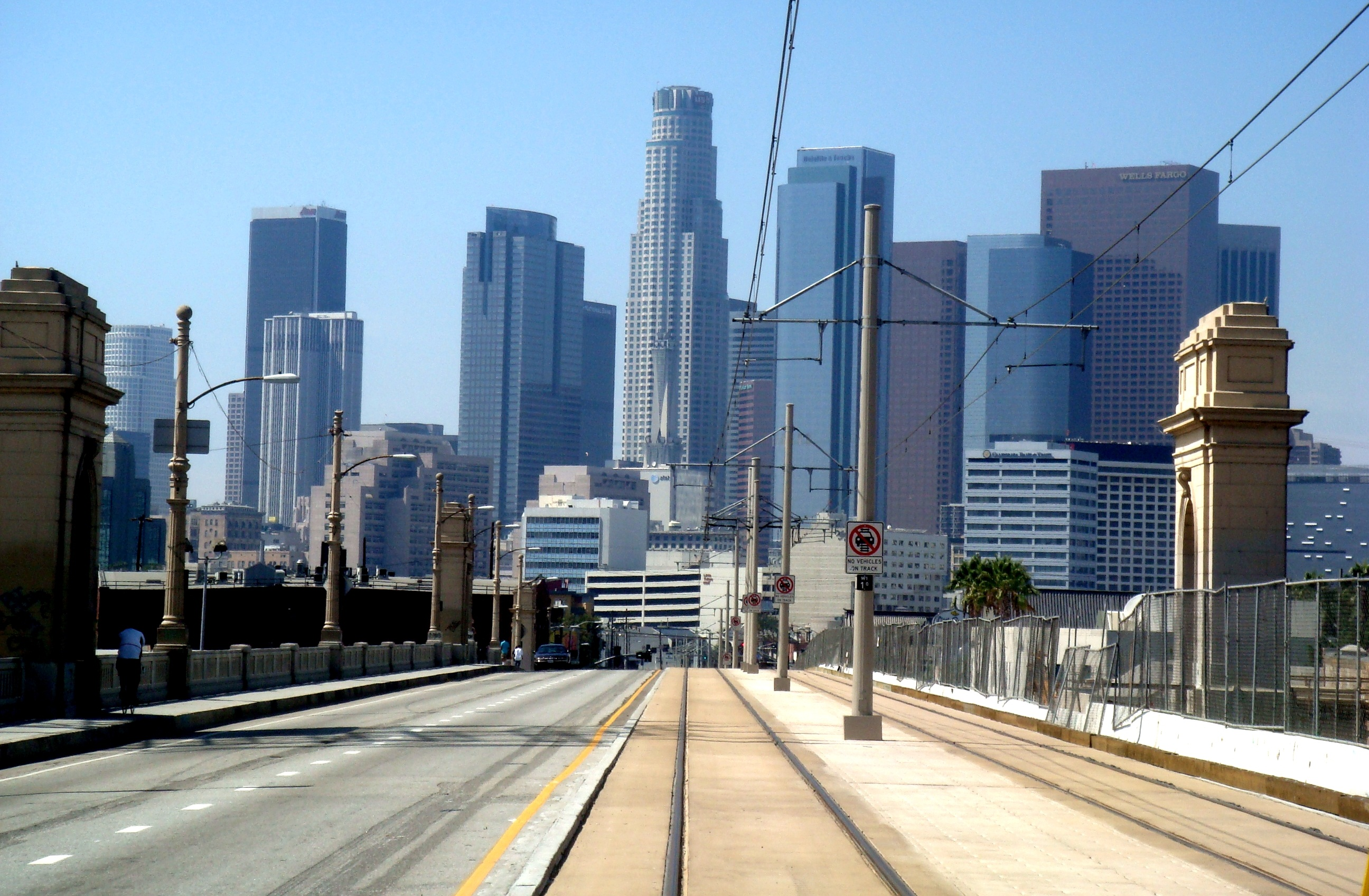
The majority of Salvadorans came to Los Angeles as refugees escaping war during the Salvadoran civil war in Central American crisis era

Salvadoran Americans

Salvadorans are the second largest Hispanic group in the United States and the second largest foreign born group in Los Angeles. The main wave of immigrants came during the Salvadoran Civil War in the 1980s, in order to escape the violence and political and economic instability in the country. Since then, Salvadorans have continued to migrate to Los Angeles as well as other cities around the United States. The community is well established in Los Angeles and stands as an integral part of its cultural and economic life.

== Demographics ==
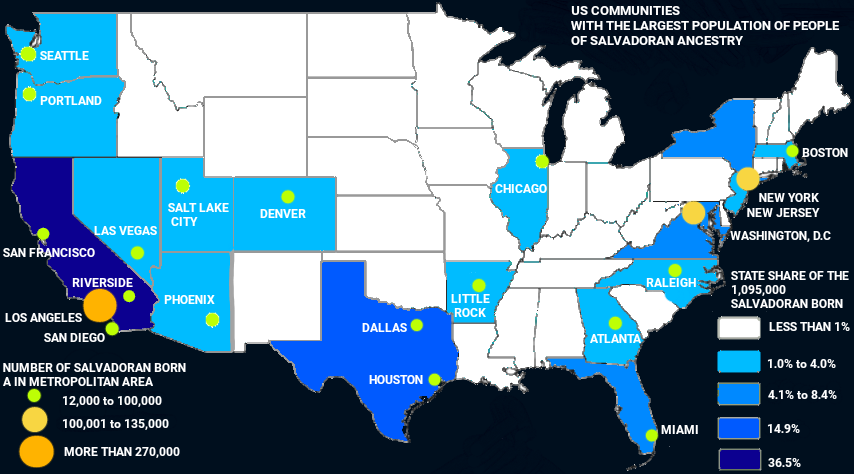
Salvadoran population in the United States. Los Angeles has a higher population than El Salvador's capital and largest city San Salvador

In Los Angeles, the Salvadoran population has a slightly larger number of women than men, which is 52.6% women versus 47.4% men out of 255,218 Salvadorans in the area. Out of 67,842 Salvadoran households in Los Angeles, about 80% of them have more than one person living in the home. About 71% over the age of 16 are employed. Men and women have about equal employment rates. Most work in education or health care industries. Another 36% are employed in service-oriented jobs. About 23.8% of men are employed in construction or maintenance occupations while only about 1.5% of women work in these sectors.

The median amount of income that Salvadorans earn per household is about $36,850 and about 30% of all families are at or below poverty level. Almost 50% of Salvadorans over 25 have not graduated high school and about 7% have graduated from college within 4 years or have a degree higher than a bachelor's degree. An estimated 95% speak Spanish at home and 53.5% speak English "less than well". Pico Union and the El Salvador Community Corridor, a part of Vermont Avenue, have the highest concentration of Salvadorans in Los Angeles.

== Culture ==
=== Language ===
Most Salvadorans speak Spanish. Among the Los Angeles diaspora, 95% speak a language other than English at home.

=== Religion ===
About 57% of Salvadorans are Roman Catholic, and there are several Latino Catholic congregations in Los Angeles. However, Central American Catholicism is different than US Catholicism; recent immigrants feel that US Catholicism does not align with their practices and so many convert to Protestantism.

Both Protestant and Catholic churches in Los Angeles play crucial roles in the diaspora community. During the civil war, churches were among the first to provide safe spaces for refugees and house them even when they did not have official US government status. They also provide services for youth to steer them away from gangs and drugs and towards education and community.

=== Family ===
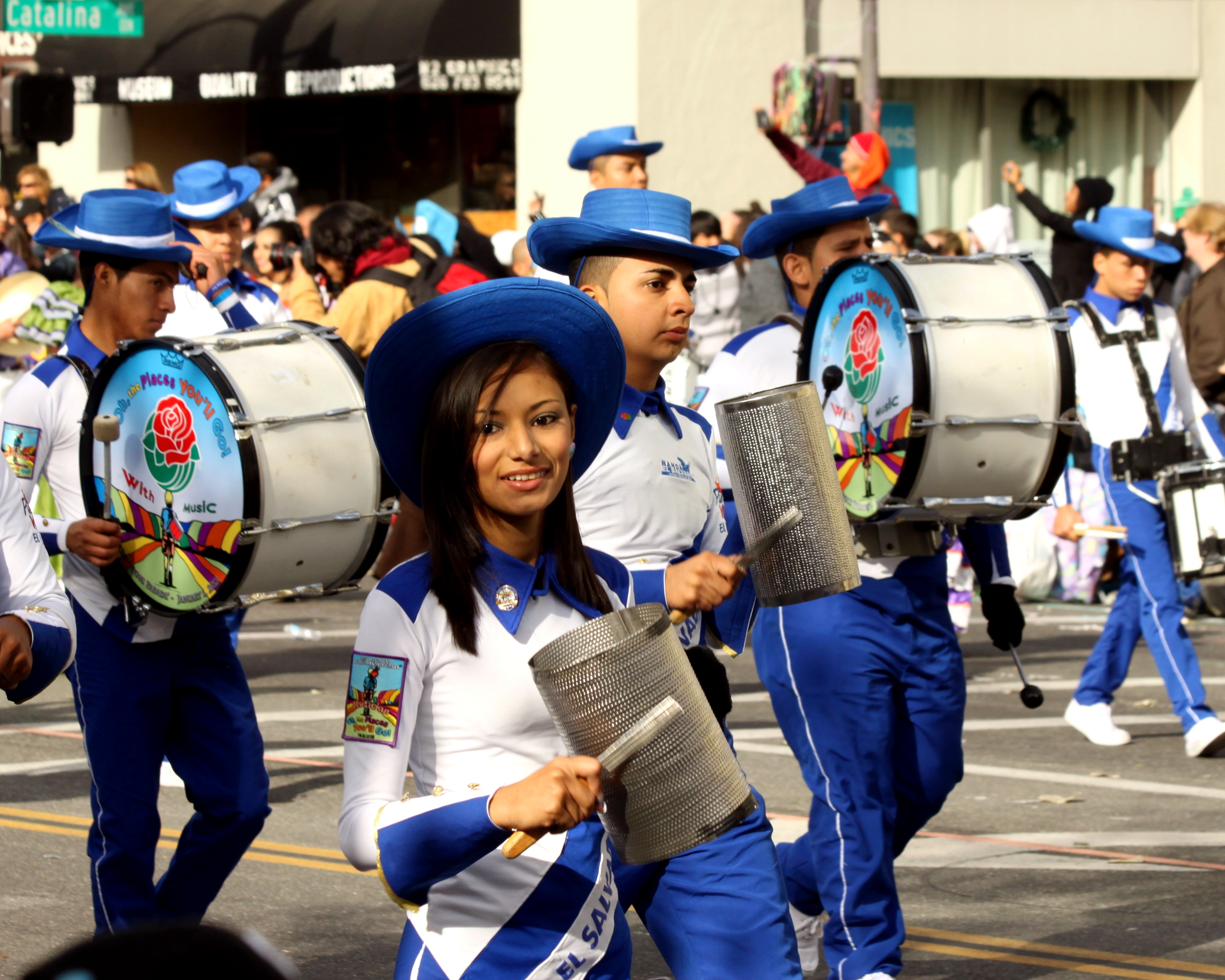
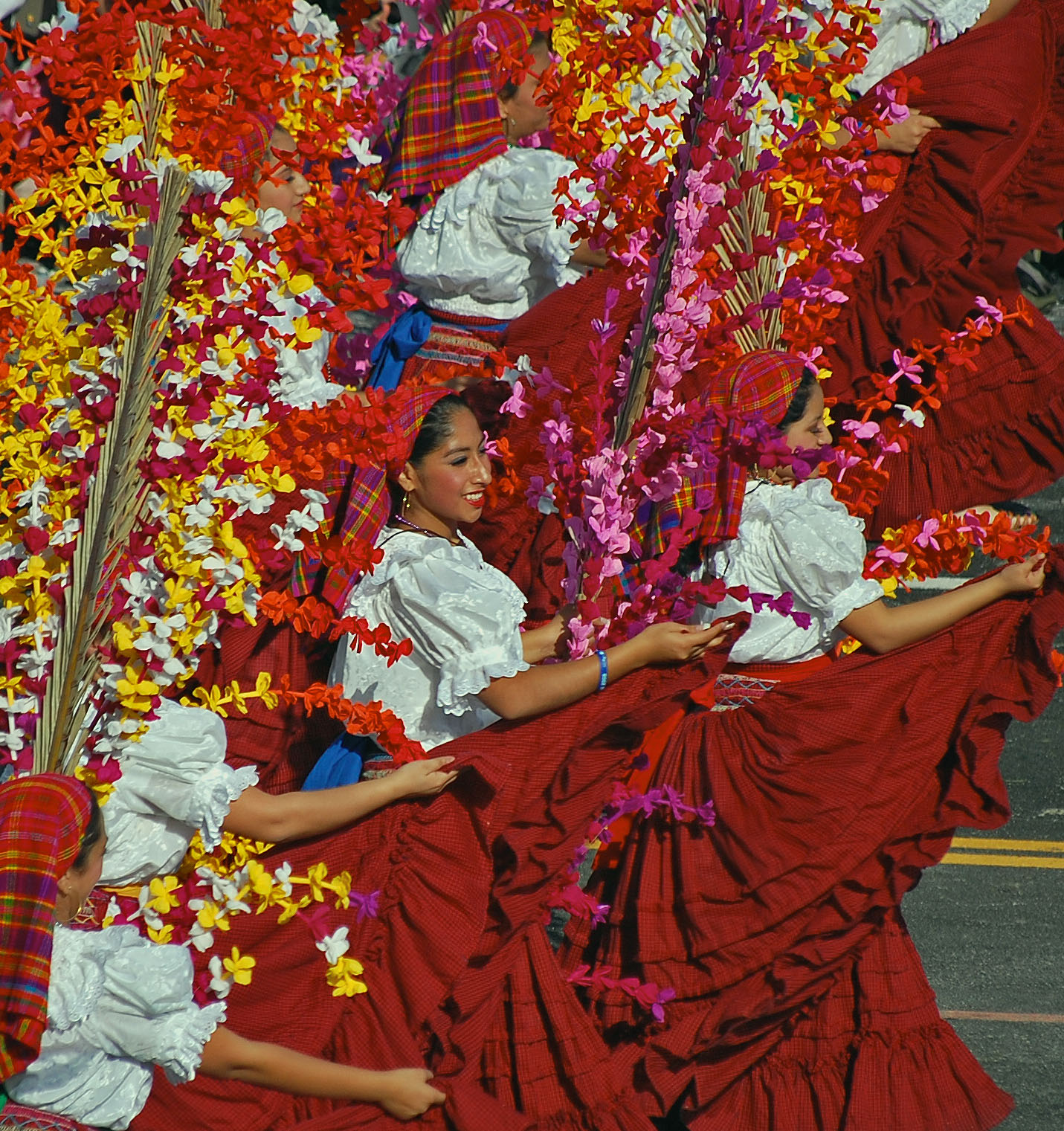
Salvadoran Americans participating in the Rose Parade. Salvadorans are the largest Central American group in Los Angeles and also in the U.S

Families in El Salvador are traditionally large and close-knit. Though men were traditionally the heads of households and the breadwinners, in the era of migration, women have increasingly become the heads as the men migrate to find work. Women also usually find work faster in Los Angeles, because of the high demand for low wage women workers in sectors such as the garment industry, the electronics industry, cleaning services, and personal aides for the elderly or children. This shift in gender roles can increase tension within families as they adjust to living in the US.

Families are often separated when parents or those able to work migrate to the US and leave children in the care of their grandparents or older siblings. Some families are reunited, but may still have tense relationships between parents and their kids as kids may have felt abandoned or their parents have lost authority after they migrated. Children usually integrate into US culture faster than their parents, causing some additional tension between parents and children due to the differences in values and interests, especially those regarding discipline and connections to El Salvador.

== History and Reasons For Migration ==
Guatemala, El Salvador, Honduras, Nicaragua, Costa Rica, Panama and Belize are historically the seven nations in Central America politically, geographically and culturally.

Salvadorans first started migrating to the United States after World War I following shipping lines that went to ports in Los Angeles. There they hoped to find jobs in coffee shipping and processing. Salvadoran Americans started emigrating from El Salvador in high numbers during the Salvadoran Civil War in the 1980s. About 20-30% of Salvadorans left the country and about half of them migrated to the U.S. the rate of emigration from El Salvador reached a peak of 46 persons per 1,000 population in 1981.

The reasons for which Salvadorans have migrated to United States vary but most of the academic community and organizations such as the U.S. Committee for Refugees and Immigrants and American Civil Liberties Union believe that migration trends are mostly derived from "direct fear of political violence and persecution." According to the Roman Catholic Archdiocese of San Salvador, which recorded many events, during the high instability of the early 1980s, there were many political killings, many of which were done by the government. Crops were also destroyed which worsen the already unstable economy and farmers who lived off their crops. With the amount of instability increasing in El Salvador, large numbers of internal migration occurred within the country that eventually resulted in the external migration of many people. The U.S government played a role in these situations. The U.S was supportive of the Salvadoran government during the civil war due to their mutual dislike of the leftist rebel group FMLN (Farabundo Marti National Liberation Front). However, the U.S State and Justice departments argue that increased violence has only caused the economic hardship to worsen which then gives more people more reason to emigrate. The Reagan administration first refused to classify incoming Salvadoran immigrants as refugees because it believed that they were merely seeking economic prosperity.

=== Gangs and Deportation ===
The most prominent gangs in Los Angeles and El Salvador are MS-13 and 18th Street Gang. La Mara Salvatrucha (MS-13) was created as a form of security for the Salvadoran immigrants in Los Angeles against the other gangs in the area. The 18th Street gang is a Chicano gang that was developed around 1959, and it is a rival to La Mara Salvatrucha. These gangs have spread to several countries in Central America, like El Salvador, Honduras, and Guatemala. The gang-related violence in Los Angeles has generally decreased from 2001 to 2009. Some of these gang members are undocumented, and when they are deported back to El Salvador, they often join the MS-13 or 18th Street cliques, or they return to the United States illegally. Although El Salvador is riddled with gang activity and crime, the United States does not consider Salvadoran immigrants to be refugees since peace was officially declared after the civil war in 1992 by the Chapultepec Peace Accords.

A diaspora is a group of people who are united by ethnic or cultural ties. It is a branch of transnationalism, which is a group of ideas coming from outside different nations or countries. A diaspora “is not a discrete entity, but rather it is a combination of contradictory convergences of people, ideas, and their cultural considerations”.

According to Danielle Renwick, tens of thousands of refugees from the Northern Triangle (Salvadorans, Guatemalans and Hondurans) came to the U.S seeking asylum from their violence ridden countries, many of them with children. Those countries that belong to the Northern Triangle were in the midst of civil wars in the 1980s.

Since their migration from the 1980s, MS 13 grew in power in the United States during the 1990s. At this time, towards the end of Clinton’s Presidency, the U.S. intervened to get these foreign individuals out of the country. To do so, foreign born residents that had varying criminal records were deported back to their homelands. The U.S. deportation policy were at an all time high, thereafter starting the trend of MS 13 influx to and from the U.S. and El Salvador.

The strict deportation policies created to target MS 13 and other gangs like M 18, created a “Revolving Door migratory pattern.” (1) The migration of MS 13 from Central America to the U.S., and being deported from the U.S. back to Central America, created an ideology that was strengthened throughout that migratory pattern. This was possible because people who fled Central America were able to come together as a group and adapt to a new way of life in the U.S. This brought about their knowledge and involvement in extortion, kidnapping, turf protection, human trafficking, and illegal drug marketing. These ideas were brought back and forth through the “revolving doors,” and they consistently found ways to improve in these areas. This was the start of their diaspora and became a source of great concern.

According to Paul Liquorie, “We have seen time and time again people who have been deported returning to the United States because they are already networked into the criminal element that is running the human smuggling routes.”

== Foreign Policy and Domestic Policy Issues ==
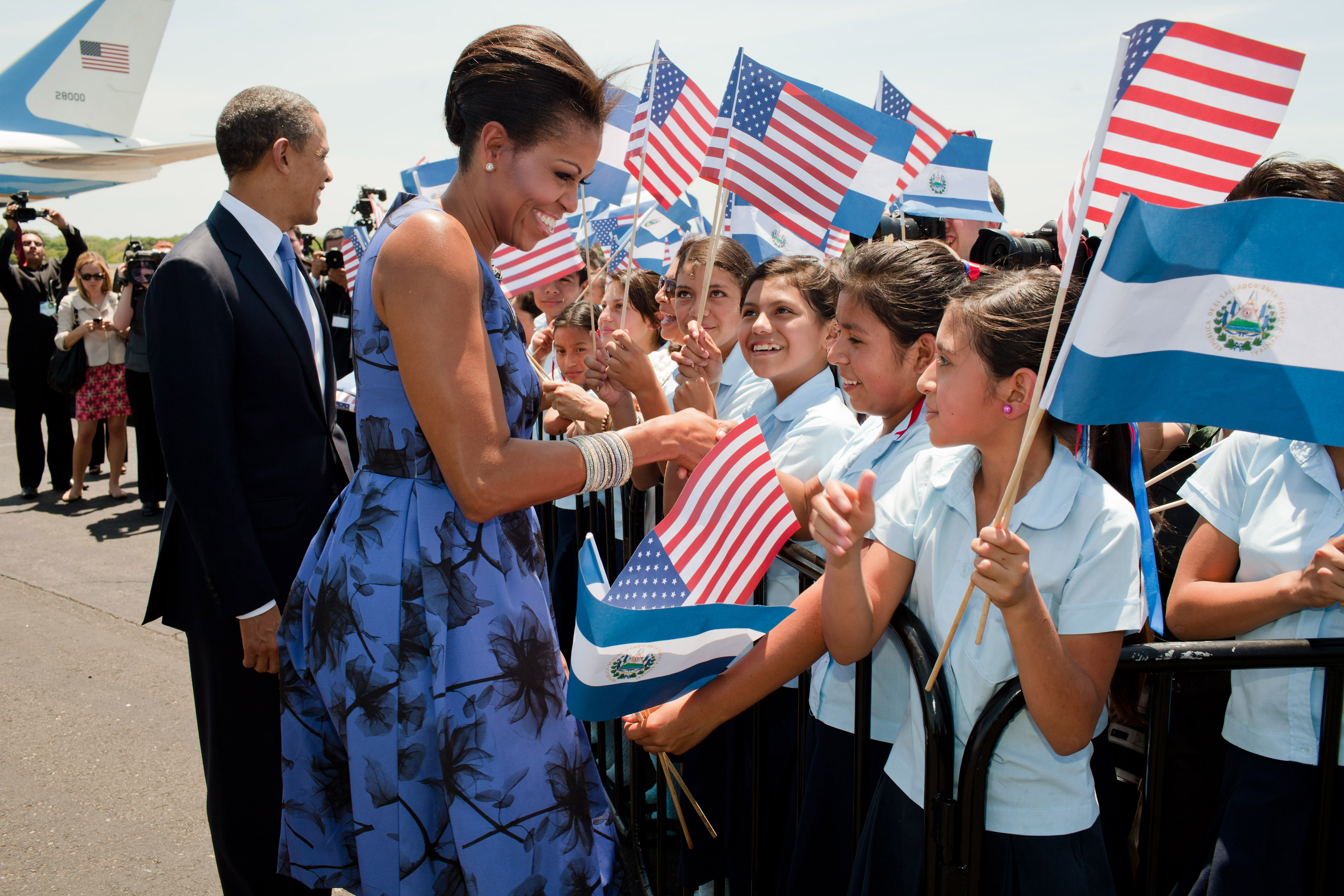
President Barack Obama and First Lady Michelle Obama greet children during the arrival ceremony at Comalapa International Airport in San Salvador, El Salvador, March 22, 2011.

Salvadoran activism was strong during the Salvadoran Civil War (1980-1992) between the right-wing government and its paramilitary forces and the left-wing Farabundo Marti National Liberation Front (FMLN) and its guerrilla fighters. The Salvadoran diaspora focused on lobbying the US government to stop supporting the Salvadoran government and to provide refugee status and temporary protected status (TPS) for Salvadorans fleeing the civil war. The US government was supporting the Salvadoran government with military aid because the US viewed it as an anti-communist force fighting the communist (FMLN). The US did withdraw support from the Salvadoran government after the Soviet Union collapsed and as the human rights violations of the Salvadoran government became more public.

After the peace treaty was signed in 1992, the Salvadoran diaspora shifted its focus inward to domestic policy issues, especially those regarding immigration, status in the US, and workers rights. The Salvadoran diaspora concentrates legal services for those in the US on visas, without visas, those seeking citizenship, or those petitioning for family to come to the US . They advocate for extending TPS and help those with TPS renew their status. The diaspora is also engaged in pushing for immigration reform that, "that acknowledges the valuable contributions immigrants bring and that respects the basic human rights of all immigrants and allows them to live a life full of dignity and equal opportunity". Salvadorans are also closely following President Obama's plan Deferred Action for Childhood Arrivals (DACA) as many youth are facing deportation and loss of status.

== Community Groups in Los Angeles and Modes of Organizing ==
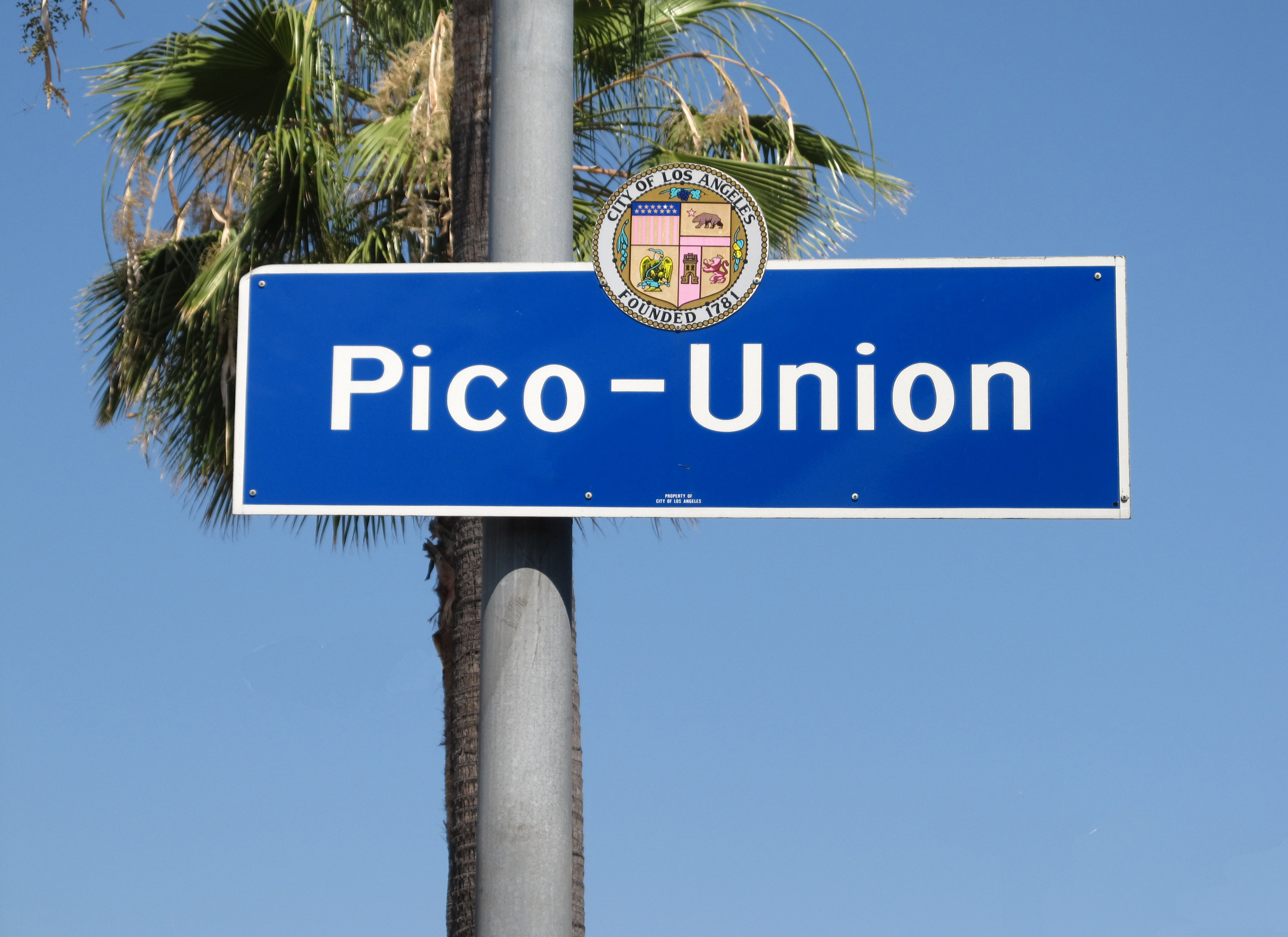
Pico-Union, Los Angeles became the first destination Salvadorans settled in when entering the city

There are many Salvadoran and Central American organizations in Los Angeles. Primary among them are El Rescate, Central American Resource Center (CARECEN), Salvadoran American National Association, and the Salvadoran American Leadership and Education Fund (SALEF). There are more left-leaning Salvadorans, those that generally support the FMLN, than right-wing, conservative Salvadorans in Los Angeles and so the left-wing activists organizations are more organized in the community. El Rescate, founded in 1981, was the first Salvadoran organization founded in Los Angeles. CARECEN, founded in 1983, came next. Most of the Salvadoran organizations in Los Angeles engage in legal services, immigration reform, education, civic and voter engagement, and cultural events for the community. The diaspora organizes through these organizations to participate in elections and vote for Salvadoran candidates or those who support Central American issues. They also organize and participate in protests for immigration reform and human rights Staffs from the organizations and members of the community also contact their representatives to fight for their issues.

Organizations also organize events for Salvadoran holidays and to celebrate Salvadoran culture. These events bring the diaspora together in a cultural identity and love for the homeland. There is a large parade every year in Los Angeles for Salvadoran Independence Day on September 15. The major event for Salvadorans every year is Feria Agostina on August 6. El Rescate has organized a parade and festival for the event every year since 1996. The festival aims to bring together the Salvadoran community, businesses, and organizations to celebrate Salvadoran culture. There are games, prizes, Salvadoran food, and parades. There is also information about financial services, housing, health care, legal services, real estate and travel to El Salvador, and remittance services. Organizations also host trips to El Salvador to teach those in Los Angeles about Salvadoran culture and instill a love for the country. To serve the daily needs of the community, CARECEN provides educational spaces for adults and youth to help with school, engage creatively, and have safe spaces to meet with others. CARECEN also runs a day labor center to connect workers in Los Angeles with employers and help workers make sure they are paid fair wages. The day labor center also provides English language programs, computer literacy programs, and health programs.

== Connections to El Salvador ==
The Salvadoran diaspora as a whole maintains strong connections to El Salvador. One of the main ways they do this is through remittances. 70% of Salvadorans in the US send remittances to friends and family in El Salvador. These remittances account for about 16% of the Salvadoran Gross Domestic Product and go to helping receivers pay for food, education, health care, clothes, and business, land, and real estate investments.

The Salvadoran diaspora also maintains several thriving industries in order to connect with El Salvador. There is a strong tourism industry of migrants returning to visit their hometowns and family. There are courier services around Los Angeles that bring money and goods to El Salvador and bring back goods, news, and letters to the US. The diaspora also invests in real estate in El Salvador either for monetary investments, for their families in El Salvador, and/or for a place to move back to and retire. The diaspora wishes to keep track of Salvadoran news, so several major Salvadoran dailies, including El Diario de Hoy and La Prensa Gráfica, have started publishing US editions. La Prensa Gráfica additionally has a section on the website called Departmento 15 that is devoted to stories about Salvadorans living abroad and international news. The name is a play on geography; El Salvador is divided into 14 departments, so those outside the country make a 15th for the country.

Salvadorans in Los Angeles engage not only socially and culturally but also politically. Salvadoran candidates may travel to the US to campaign in the hopes of raising funds and convincing Salvadorans outside El Salvador to tell their friends and family in El Salvador how to vote. After lobbying the Salvadoran government, starting in 2014 Salvadorans living abroad are able to vote in the presidential elections. Emigrants say they deserve this right because they support the country economically and so should have influence in the political processes.

== Notable Salvadorans from Los Angeles ==
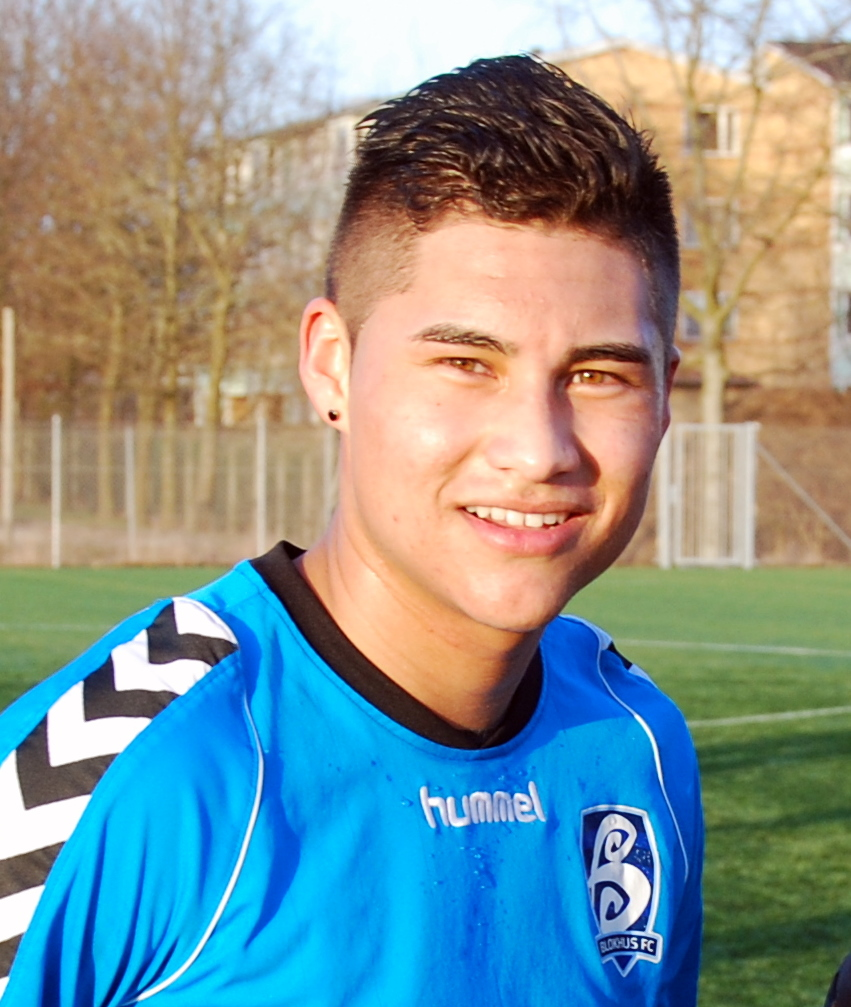
Dustin Corea (soccer player)

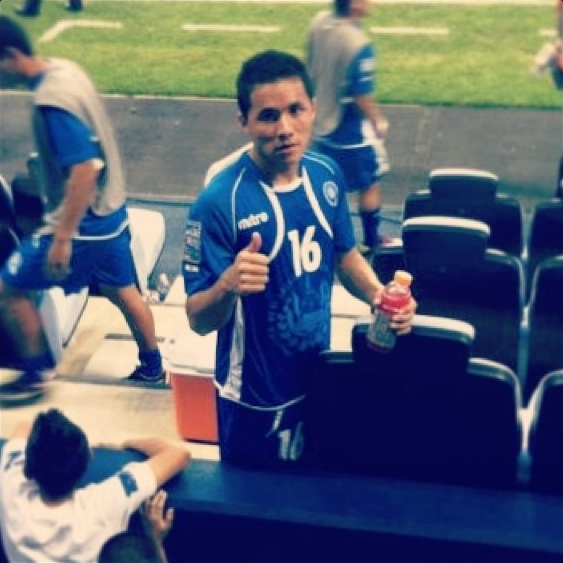
Richard Menjívar (soccer player)

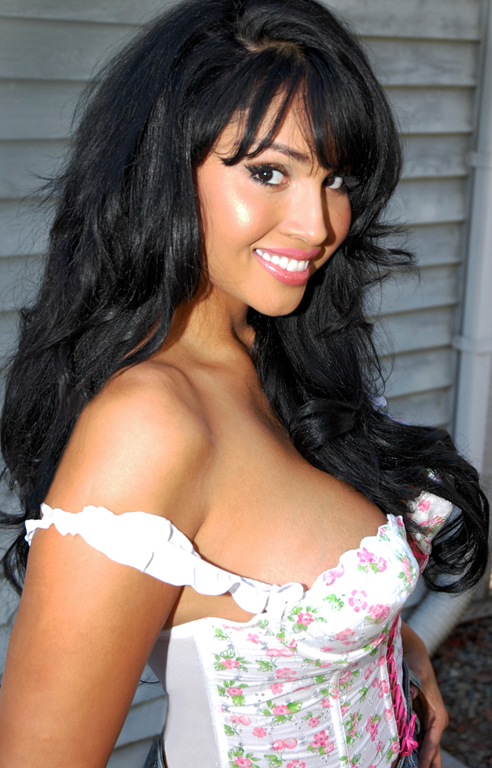
Somaya Reece (singer)

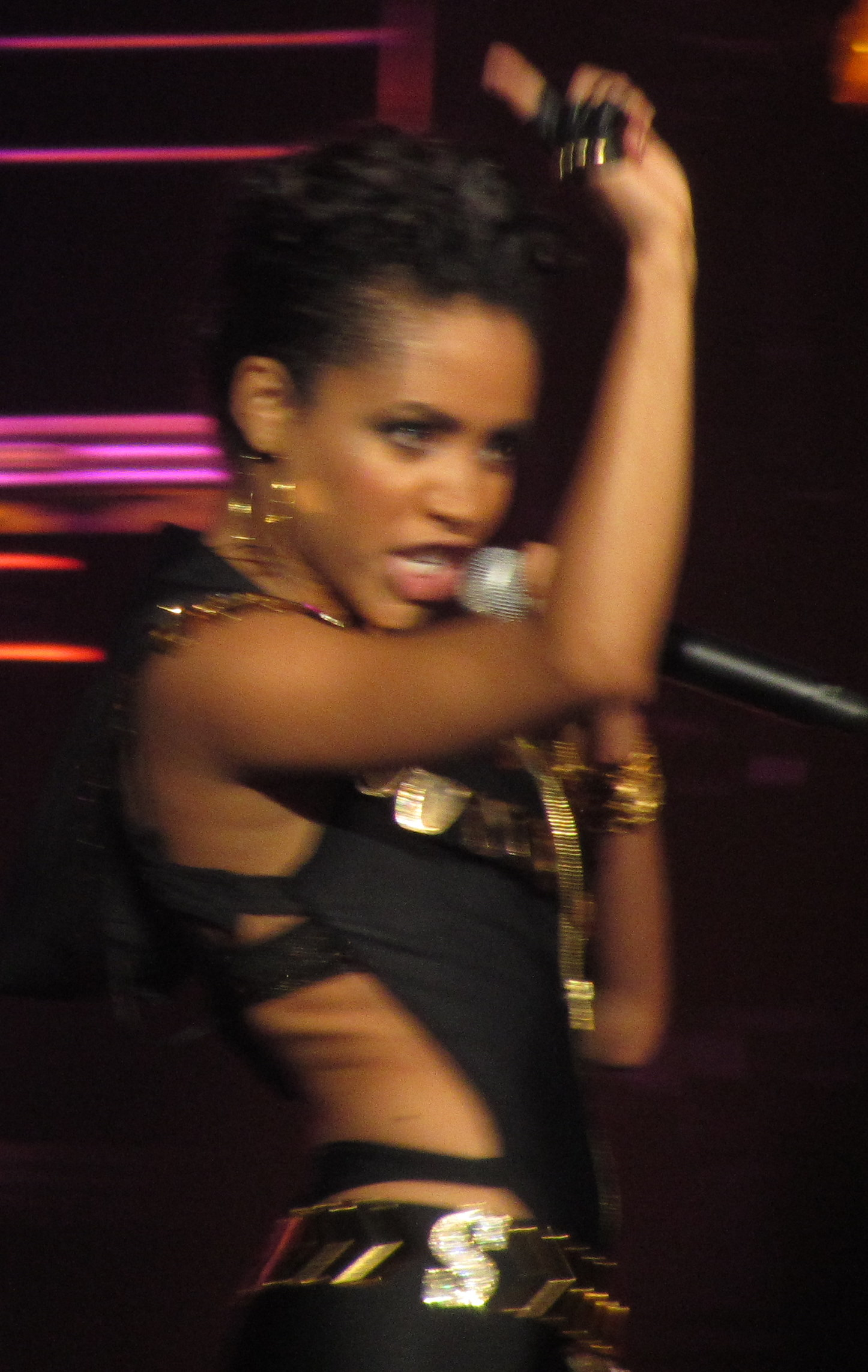
Sabi (American singer)

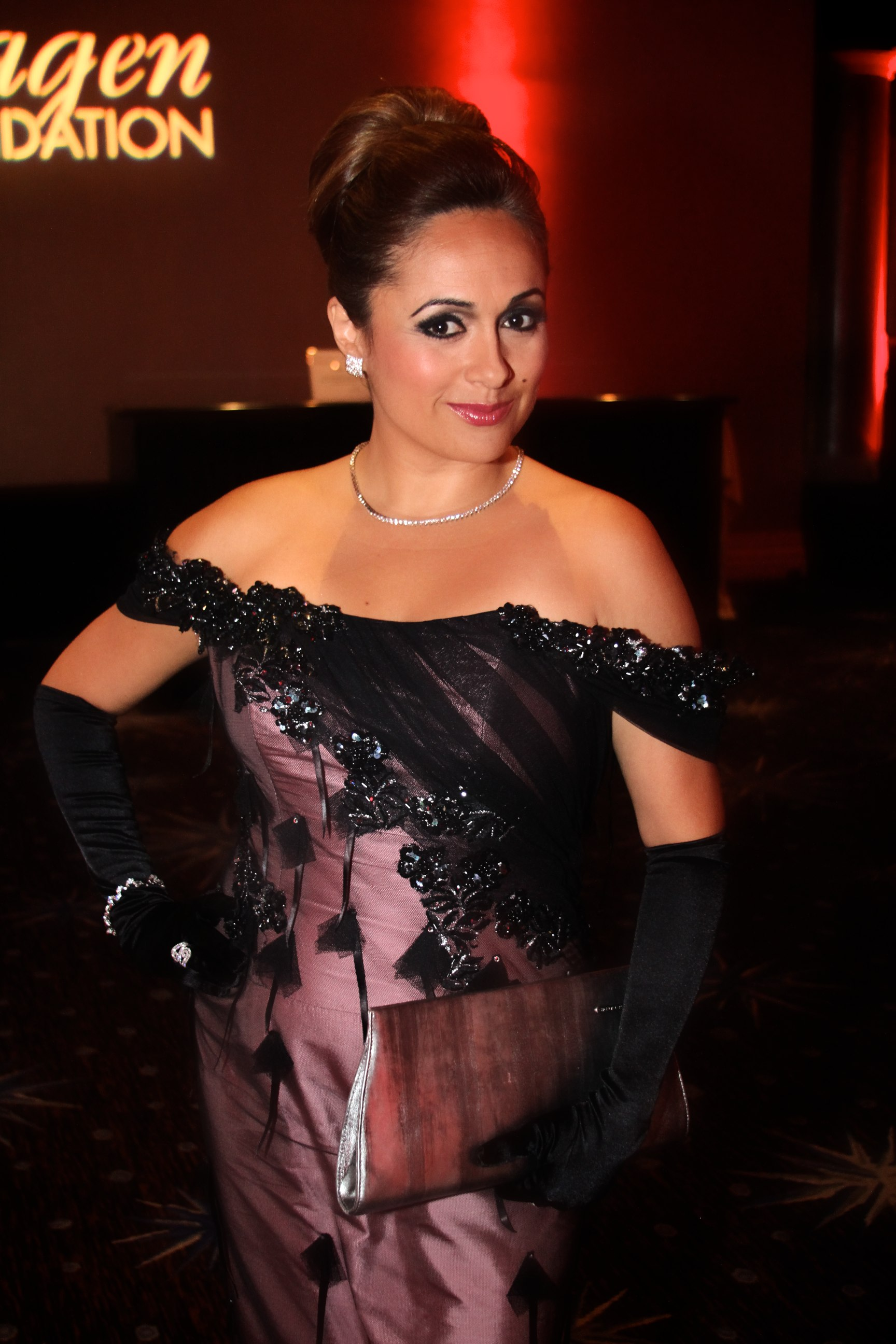
Elizabeth Espinosa (journalist)

== See also ==
- History of Central Americans in Los Angeles
- History of Mexican Americans in Los Angeles
