= History of Central Americans in Los Angeles =

The City of Los Angeles includes a prominent Central American population. As of 2010 it is the second largest Latino and Hispanic ethnic group in Los Angeles after Mexican-Americans. The largest Central American groups were Guatemalans, Hondurans and Salvadorans.

== History ==
The first Central Americans arrived in the 1940s. In the 1970s the population of Central Americans were evenly distributed between the national origins and was relatively small. David E. Lopez, Eric Popkin, and Edward Telles, authors of "Central Americans: At the Bottom: Struggling to Get Ahead", stated that the Central American groups with "runaway" growth were the Guatemalans and Salvadorans. By 1980 the Guatemalan and Salvadoran populations were the largest Central American populations in Greater Los Angeles. Between 1980 and 1990 these groups increased almost by fivefold. Many Salvadorans were fleeing the Salvadoran Civil War.

In 2008 Esmeralda Bermudez of the Los Angeles Times wrote that by then there were strong relations between the Salvadoran community and the Mexican community, noting that they "have mingled at work, school and church for nearly three decades; they have intermarried, baptized each other's children and cried at each other's funerals."

As of 2010 the majority of Los Angeles's Central American population had arrived during the late 1970s and the late 1980s. Due to civil wars and political persecution, many Guatemalans and Salvadorans arrived in the 1980s.

== Economics ==
As of 1996 the predominant occupation of the Guatemalan and Salvadoran groups in Los Angeles are manufacturing and service jobs that pay low wages.

As of 1996, the median income of Guatemalan and Salvadoran households of Los Angeles is about 60% of the median income of non-Central American groups.

When many Salvadorans arrived in Los Angeles in the 1980s, they sought employment at Mexican-owned businesses because there was no pre-established significant Salvadoran community. This put pressure on Salvadorans to adopt Mexican culture and customs.

== Demographics ==
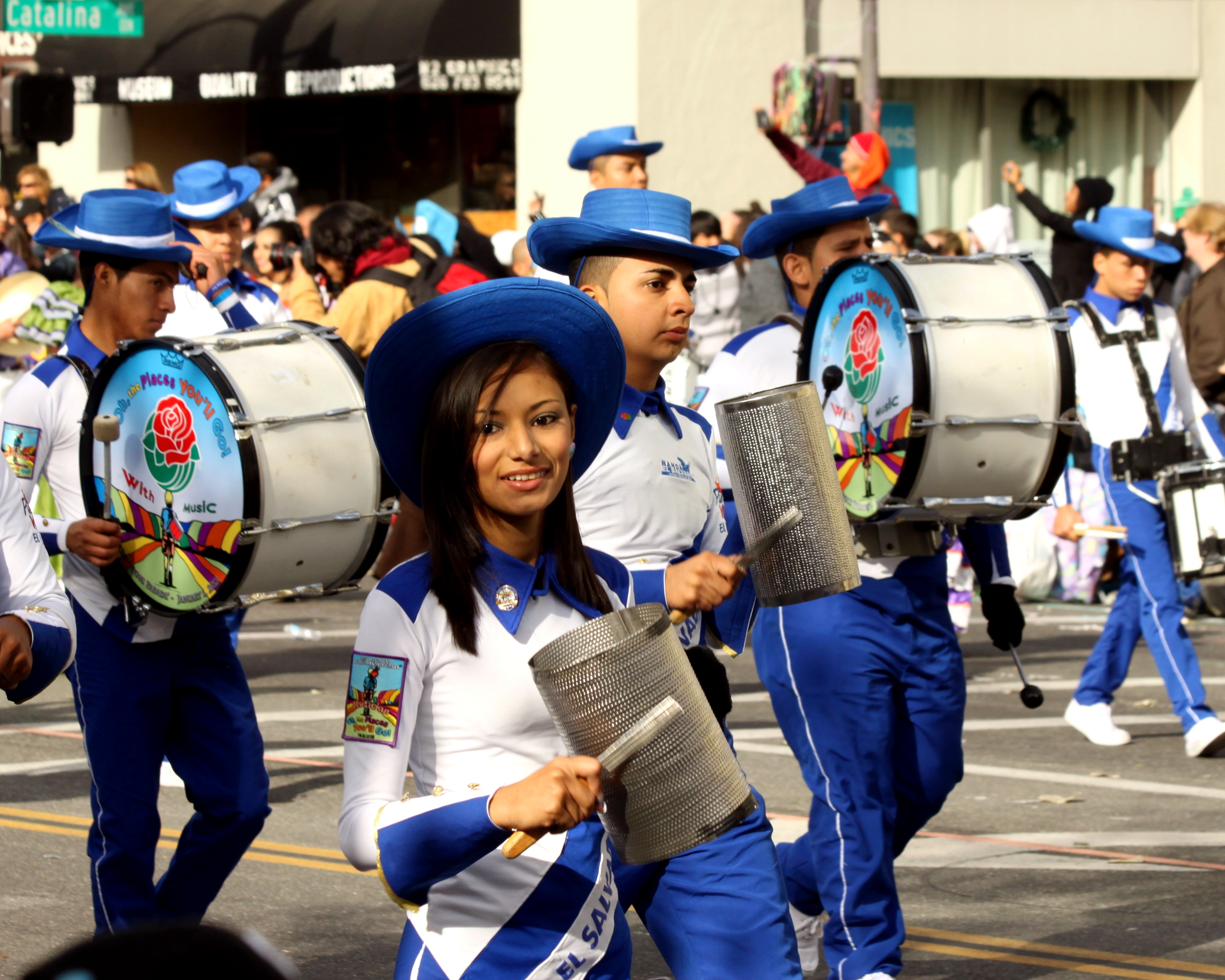
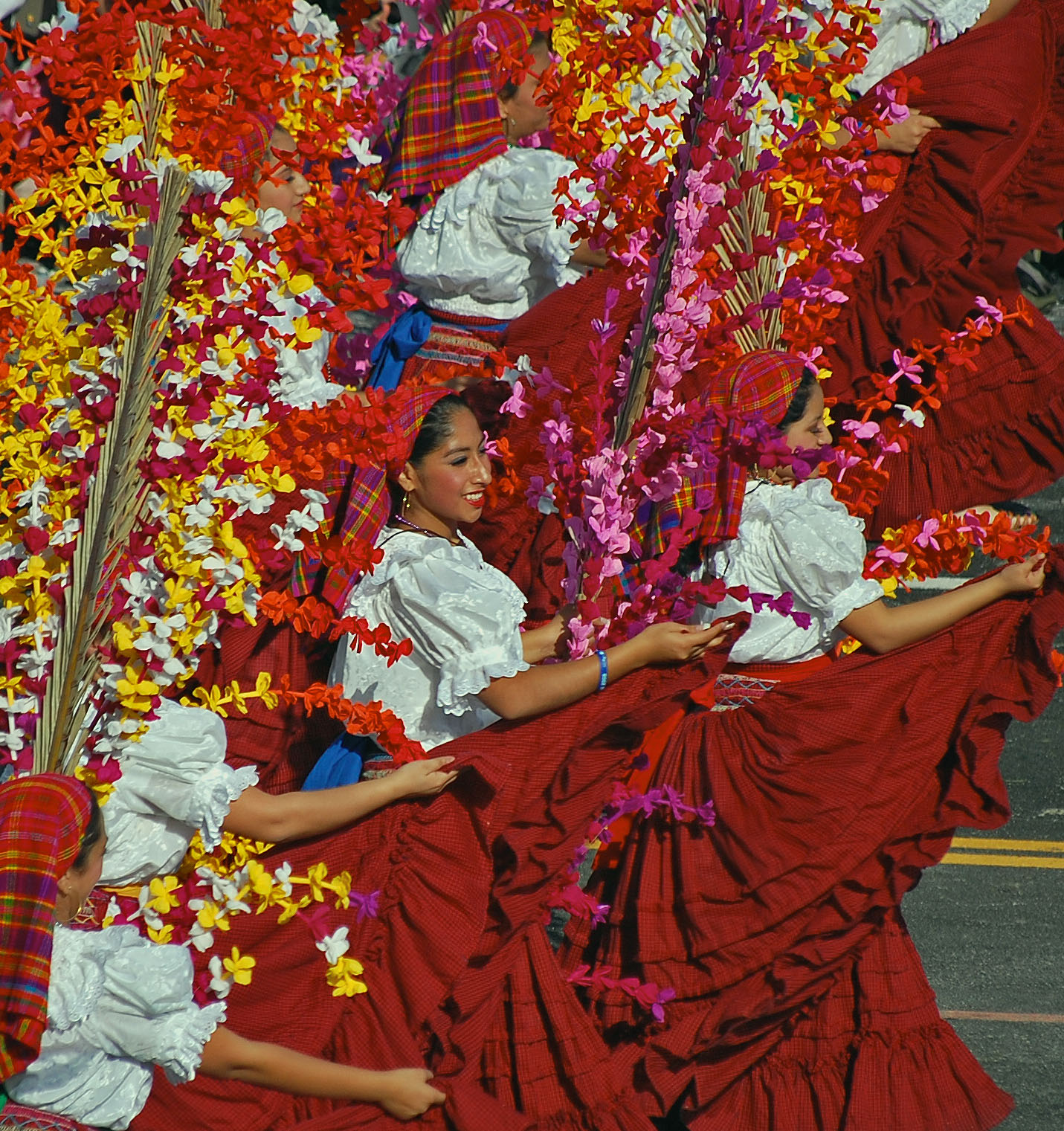
Salvadoran Americans participating in the Rose Parade. Salvadorans are the largest Central American group in Los Angeles and also in the U.S

As of 2009 up to 560,000 Central Americans lived in Greater Los Angeles. "As many as 560,000 Central Americans live in the Los Angeles area." As of 2008 over 350,000 ethnic Salvadorans lived in Los Angeles County. Most of them lived around MacArthur Park.

As of the 1990 U.S. Census there were 580,000 Central Americans in Greater Los Angeles. This includes 302,000 Salvadorans, 159,000 Guatemalans, 44,000 Nicaraguans, and 75,000 from other Central American countries. The total number of Central Americans makes up 44% of all Central Americans in the entire United States, and 12% of the Latino population.

As of 1996 the family size of Central American households is, according to Lopez, Popkin, and Telles, "considerably" above average.

As of 1996 the poverty rates of Guatemalan and Salvadoran households in Los Angeles is 2.5 times greater than the rate of non-Central American households. The per capita income of Guatemalans and Salvadoran Americans is fewer than 40% of the per capita income of non-Central Americans. The disparity in earning between Central Americans and non-Central Americans is more severe than the median income disparity, but Lopez, Popkin, and Telles wrote that the larger than average number of wage earners per household "somewhat" compensates for the earning disparity.

== Geography ==
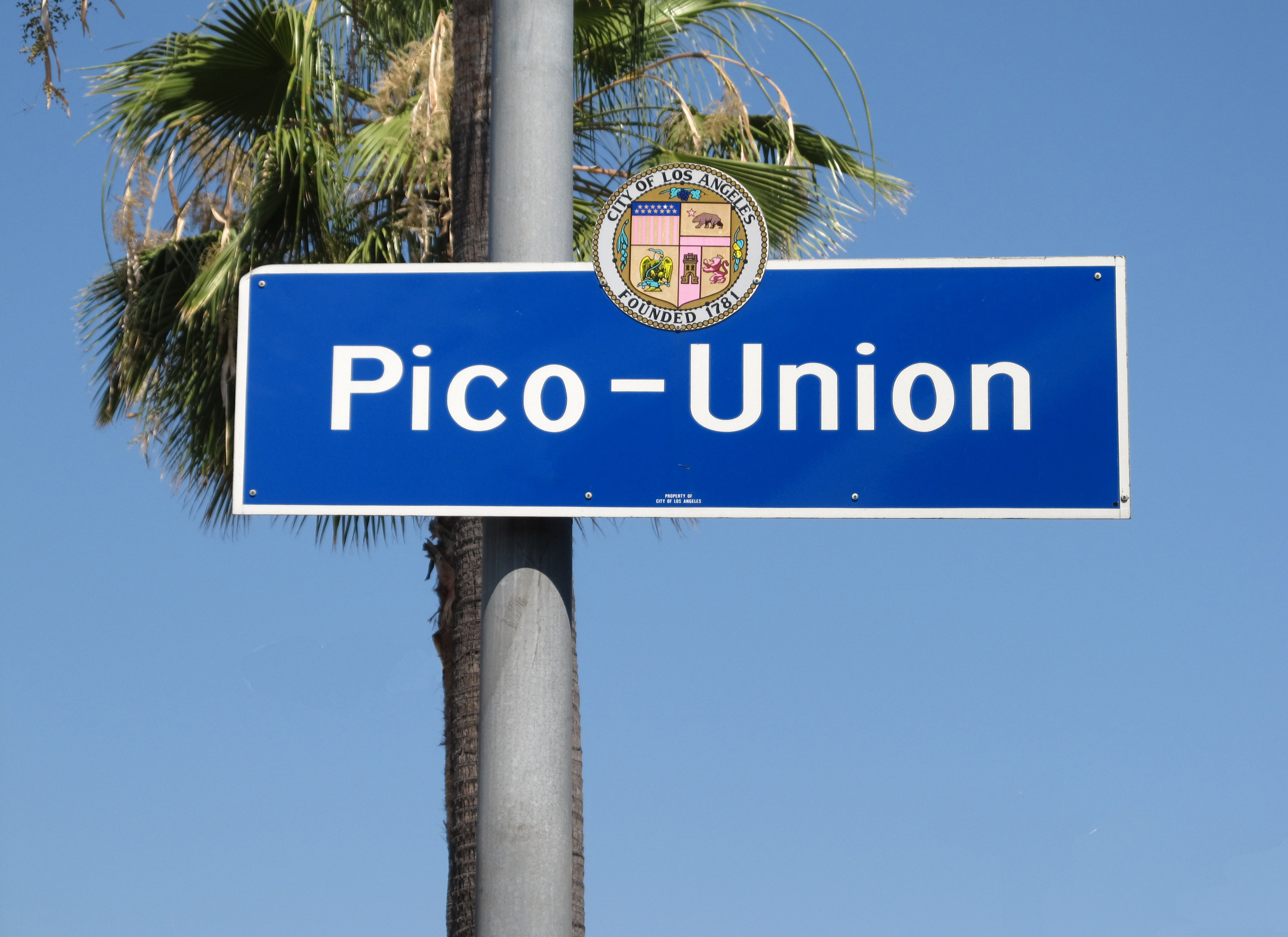
Pico-Union, Los Angeles became the first destination Central Americans settled in when entering the city

Rosamaria Segura, the author of Central Americans in Los Angeles, wrote that the Pico-Union area has the "most conspicuous" presence of Central Americans in Los Angeles. In August 2012, the City of Los Angeles designated a portion of Vermont Avenue in Pico-Union as the "El Salvador Community Corridor."

== Languages ==
As of 1996 the Central American groups continue to speak their native languages.

As of 2008 many Salvadoran immigrants began adopting Mexican Spanish due to contact with the Mexican community and in order to better fit into the Mexican community, along with adopting aspects of Mexican culture. Some Salvadorans in Los Angeles insist on using Salvadoran Spanish.

== Education ==
The Oscar Romero Charter Middle School opened in 2007. The school, named after Óscar Romero, teaches Salvadoran children about their heritage.

== Culture and recreation ==
Salvadoran Day is celebrated in Los Angeles each summer. Many pupusa restaurants operate in Los Angeles.

U.S Central Americans

Salvadoran Americans

Guatemalan Americans

Honduran Americans

Nicaraguan Americans

Costa Rican Americans

Panamanian Americans

Belizean Americans

== Notable Central Americans from Los Angeles ==
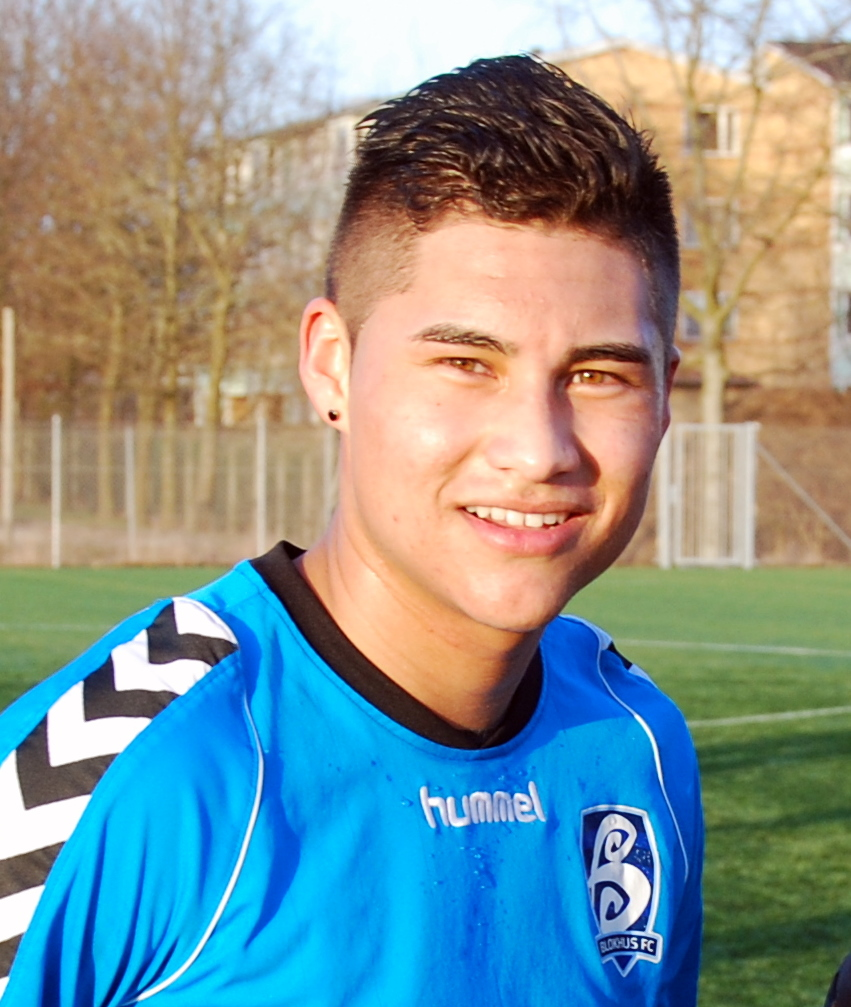
Dustin Corea (soccer player)

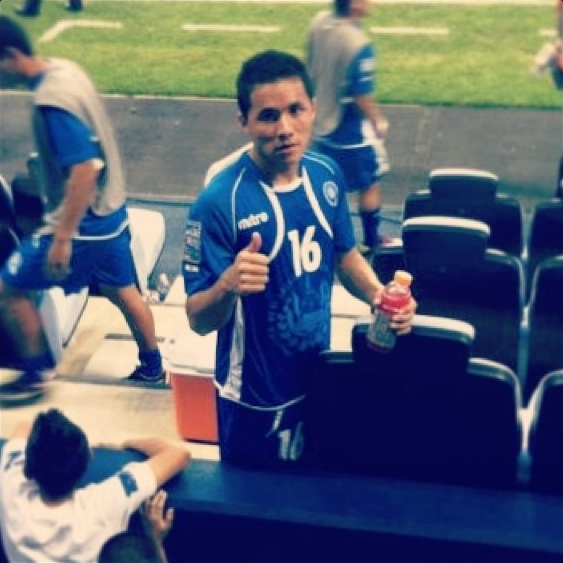
Richard Menjívar (soccer player)

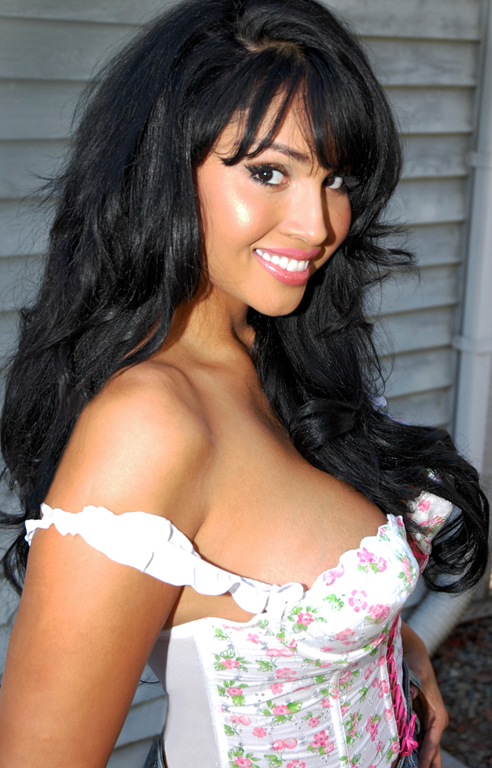
Somaya Reece (singer)

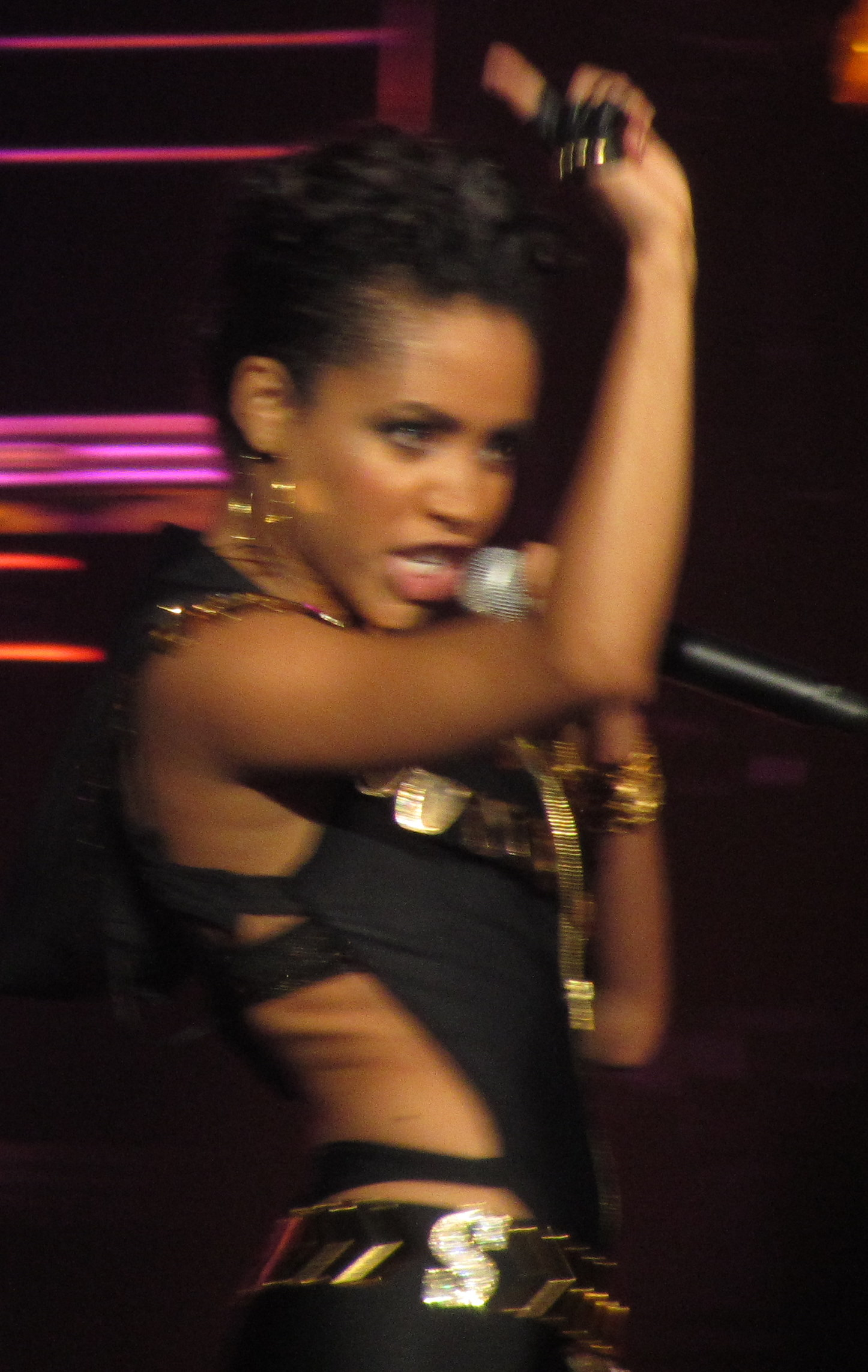
Sabi (American singer)

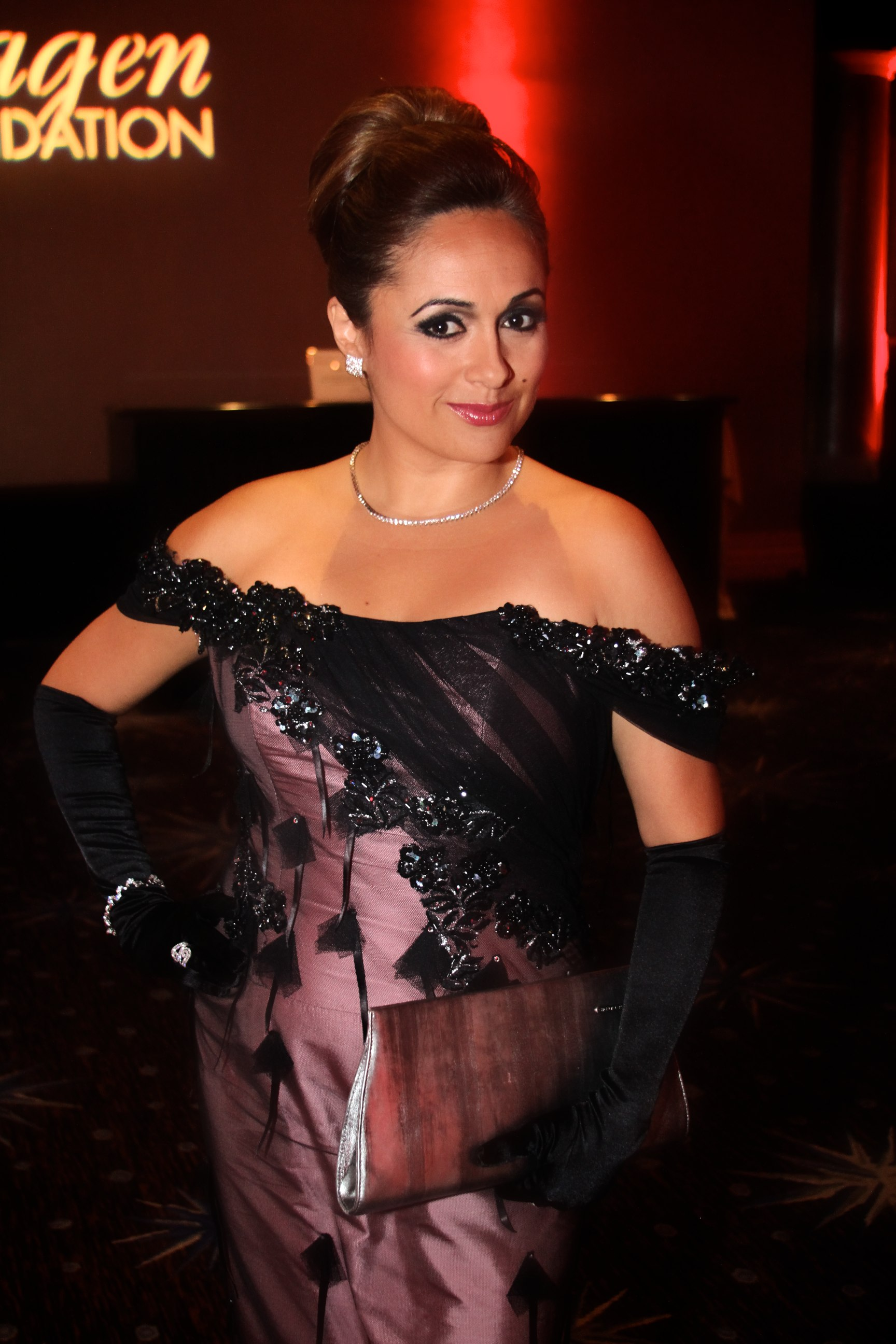
Elizabeth Espinosa (journalist)

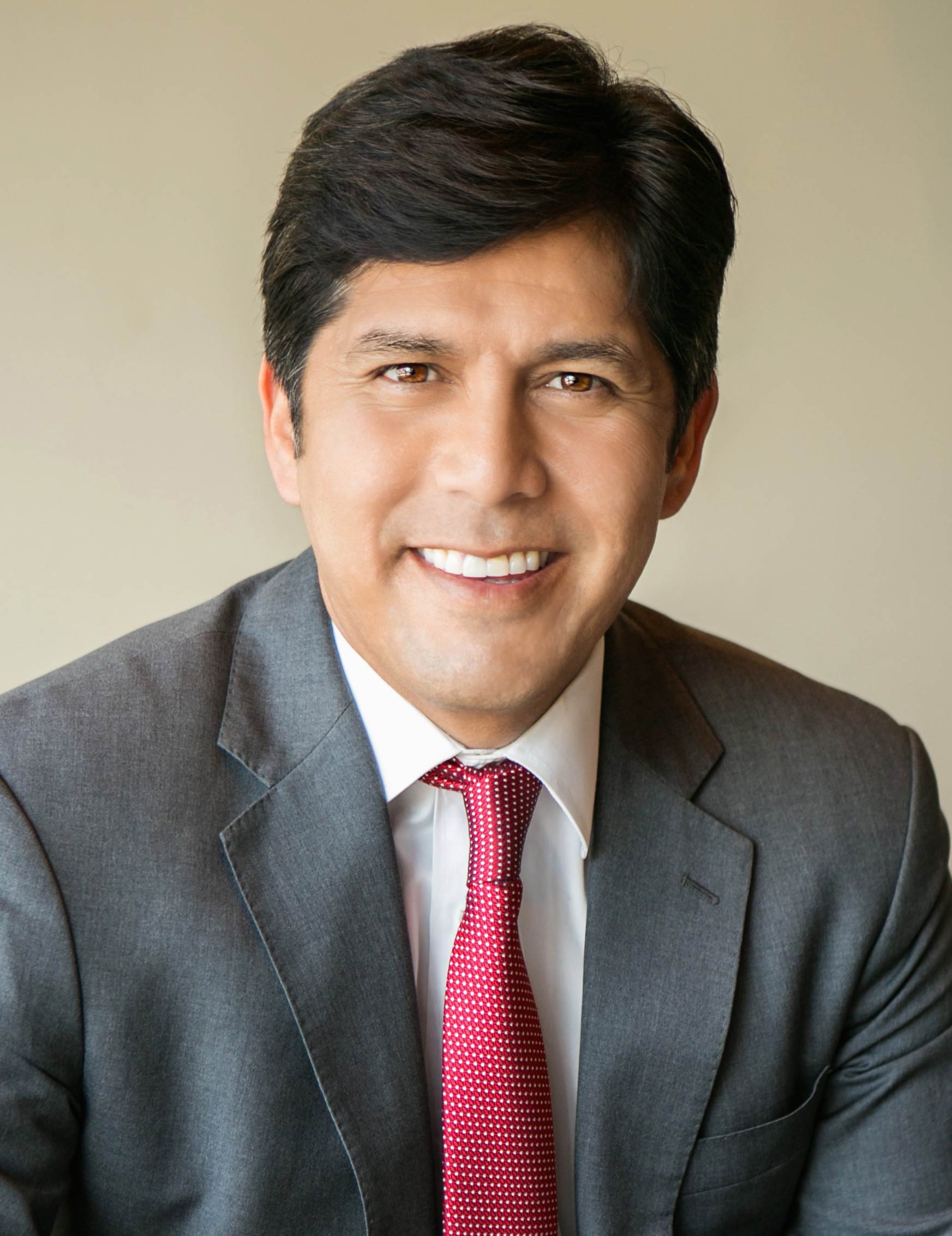
Kevin de León (politician)

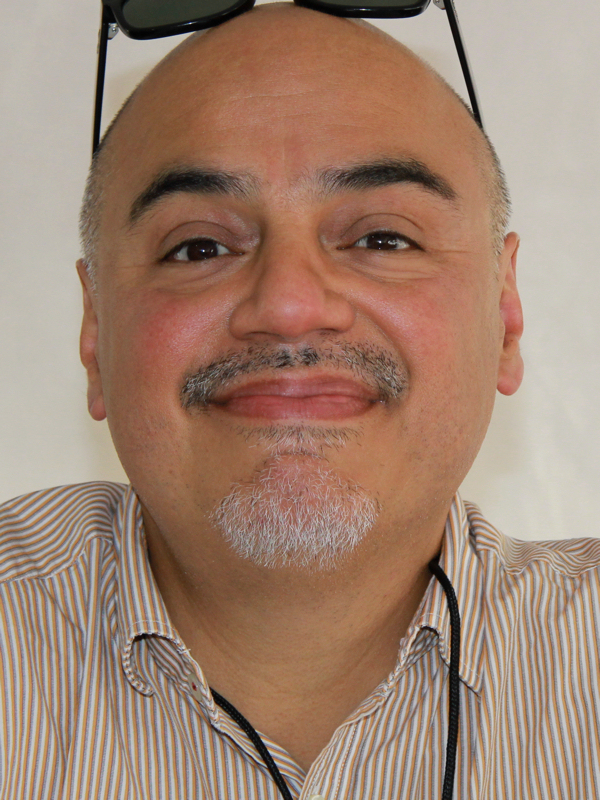
Héctor Tobar (journalist)

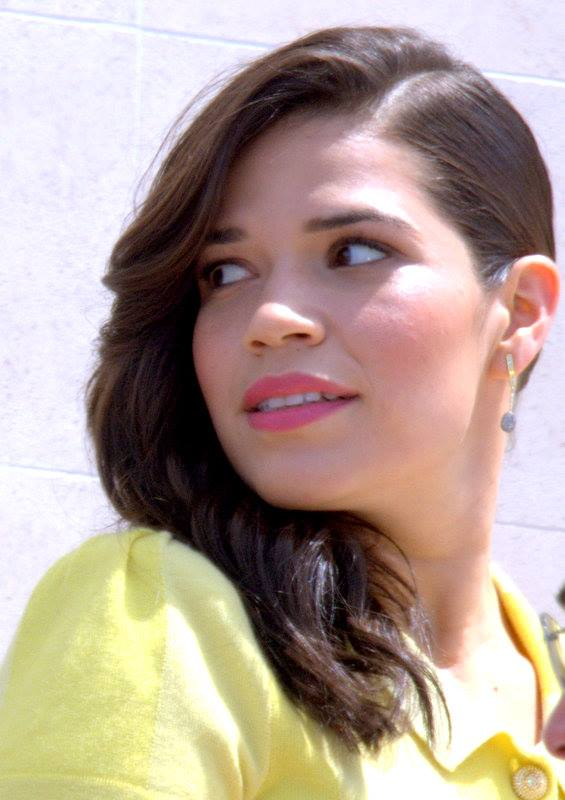
America Ferrera (actor)

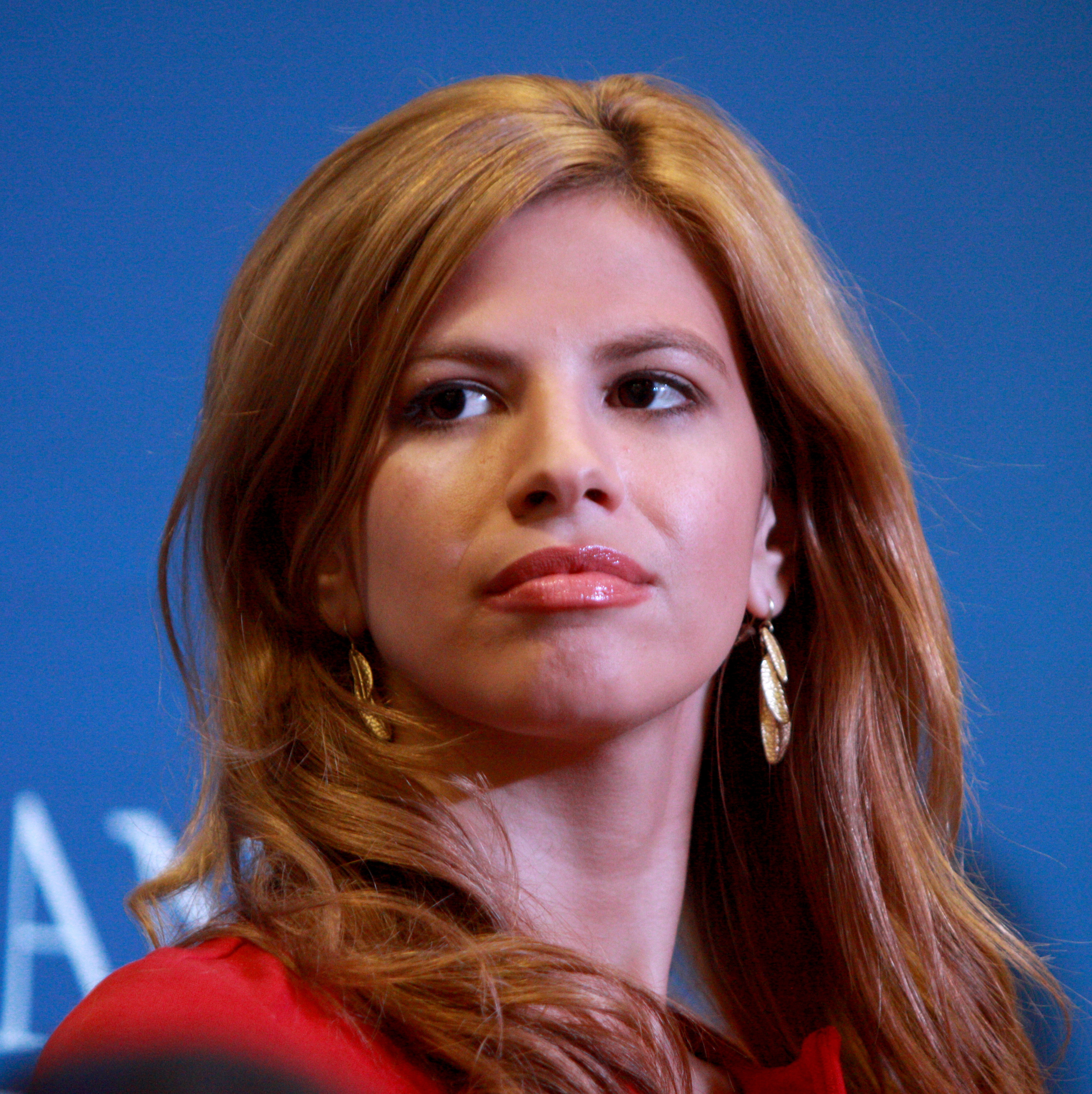
Michelle Fields (journalist)

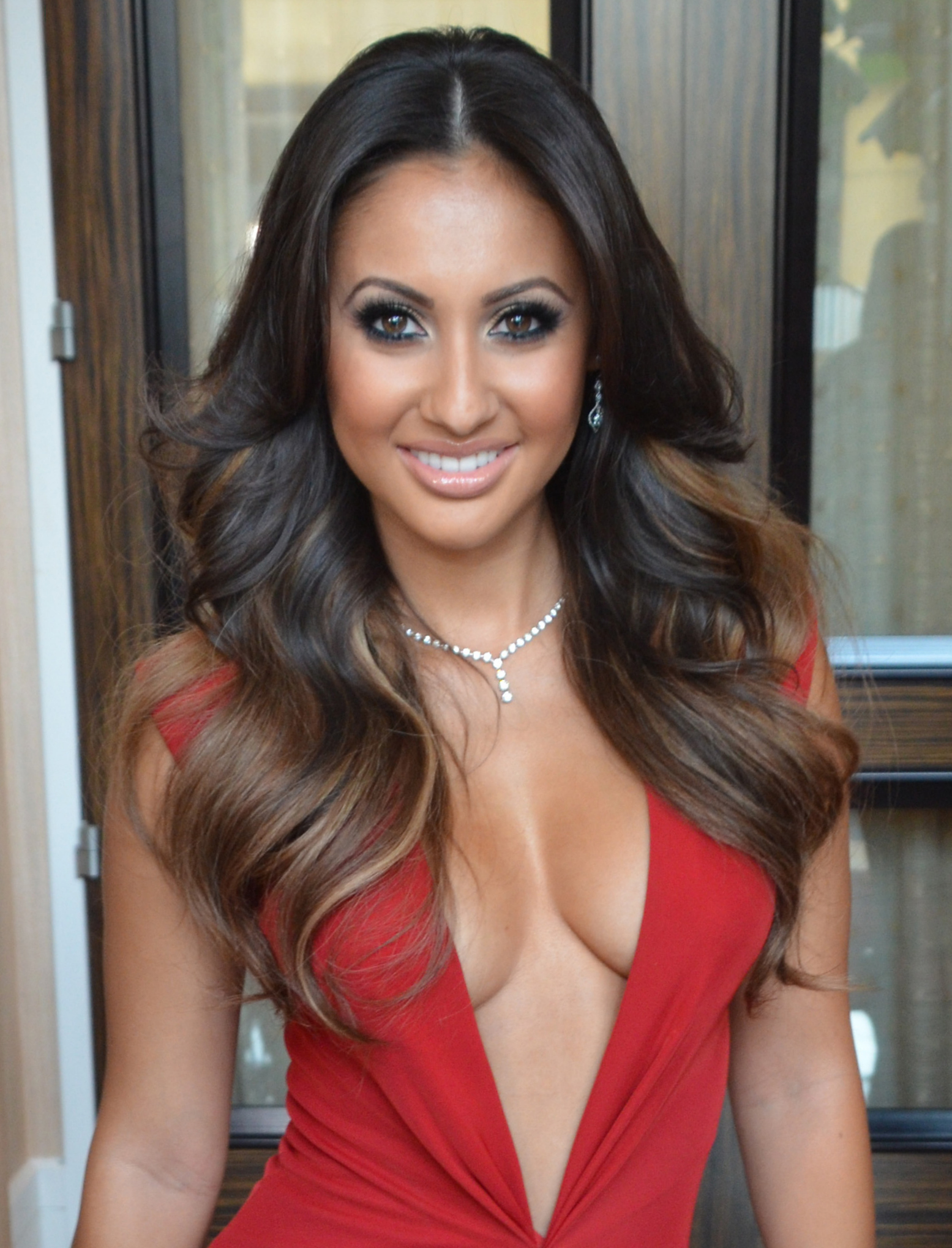
Francia Raisa (actor)

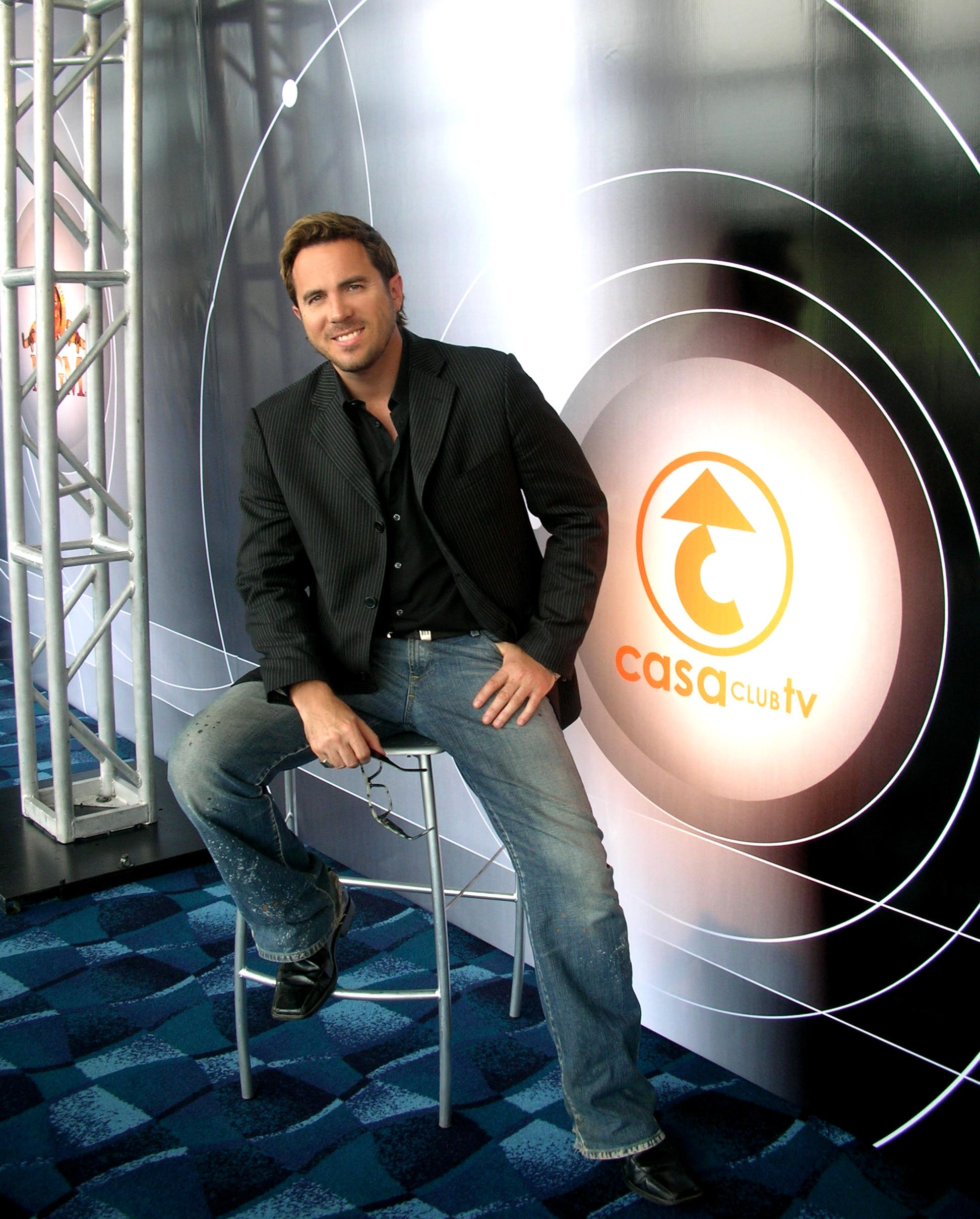
Gabriel Traversari (actor)

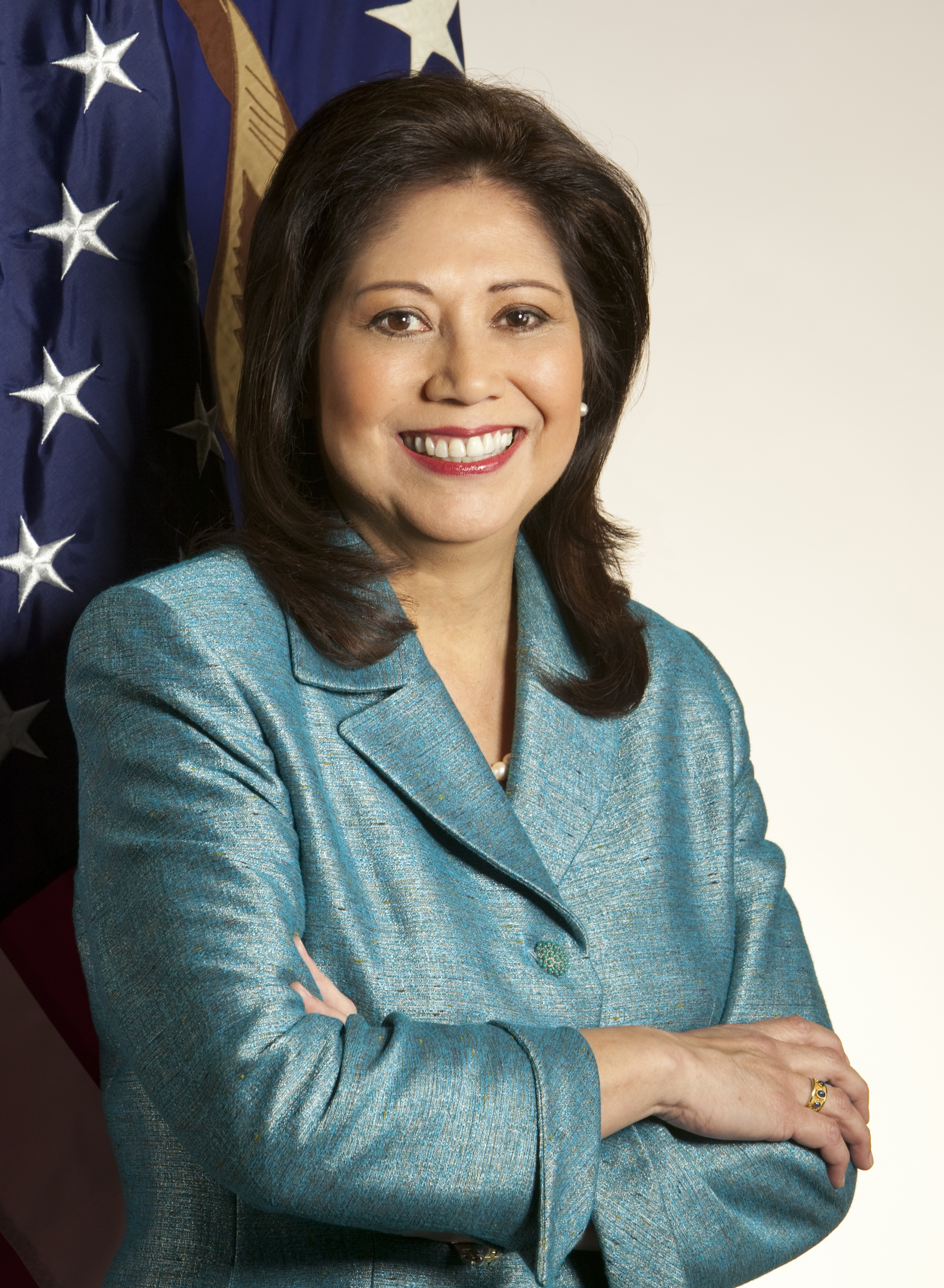
Hilda Solis (politician)

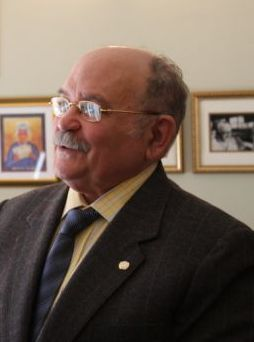
Miguel d'Escoto Brockmann (politician)

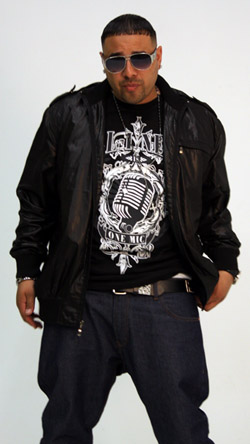
J Smooth (singer)

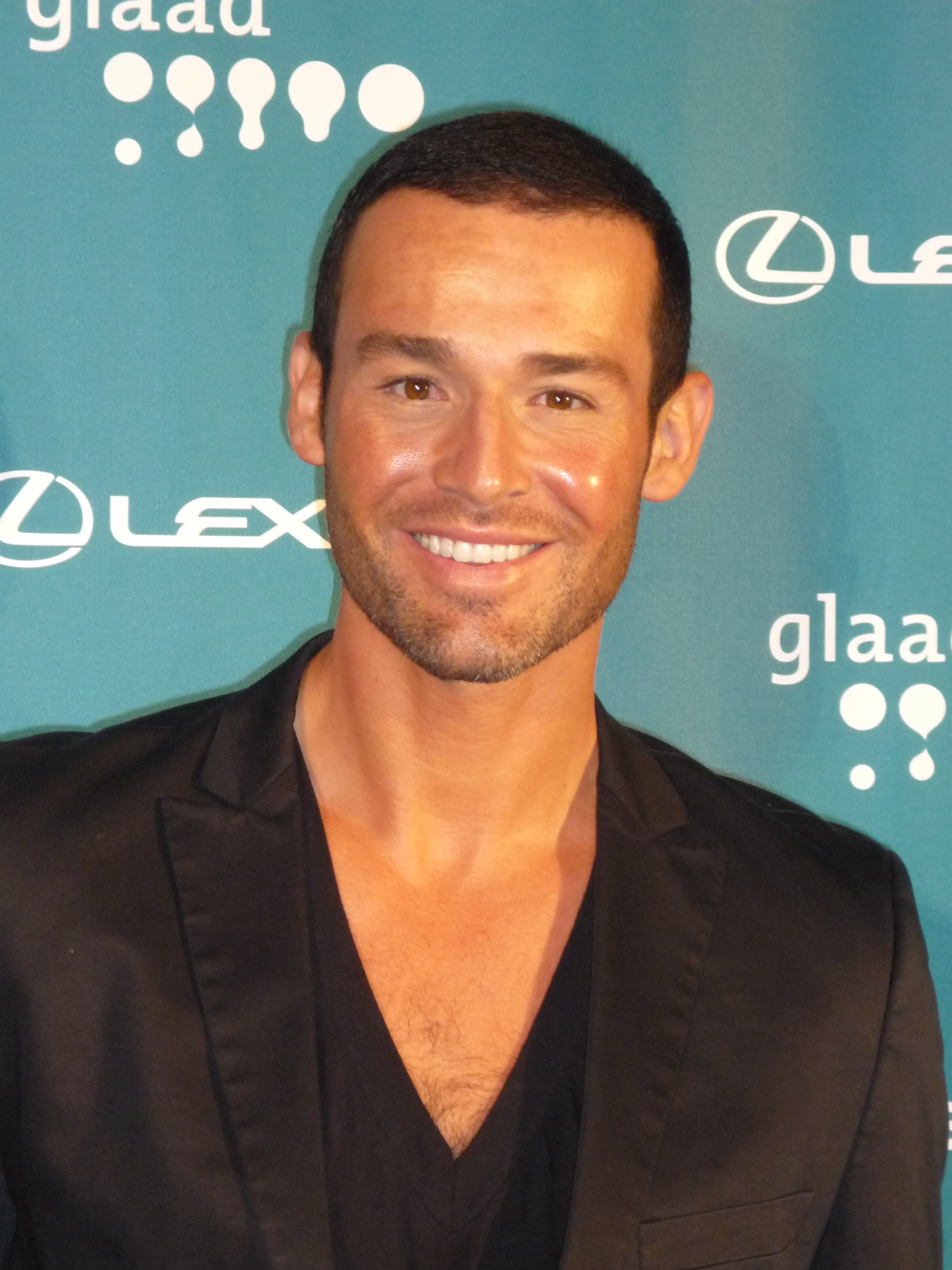
J. P. Calderon (model)

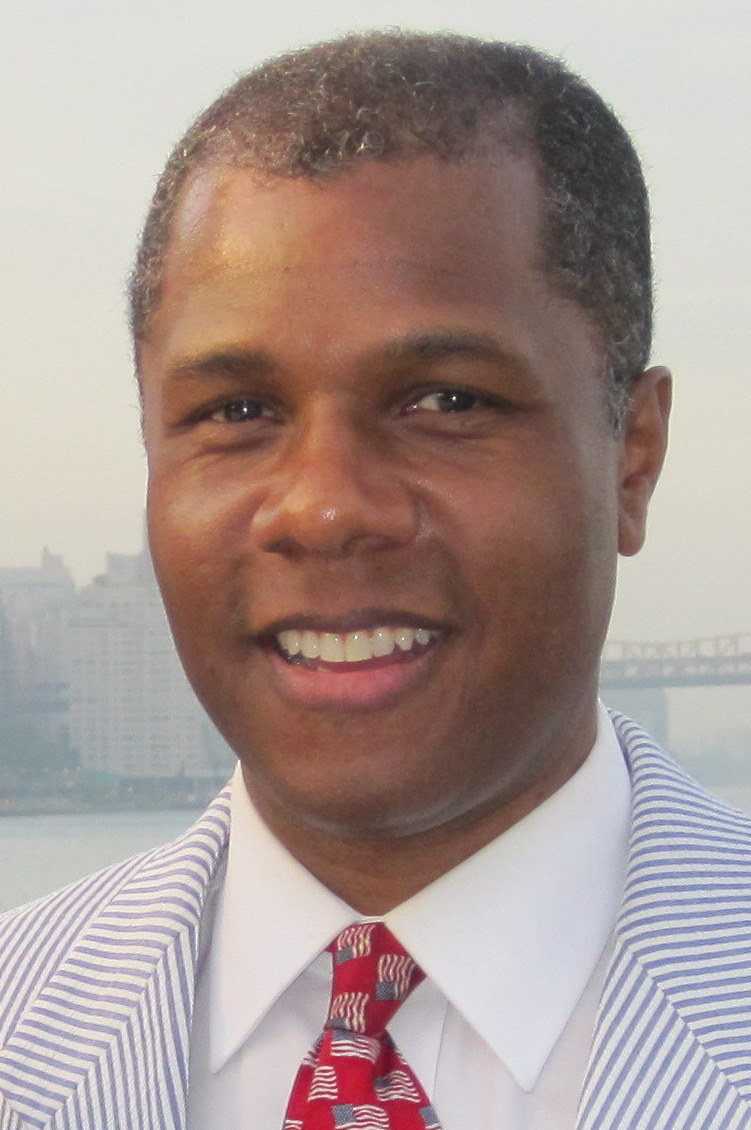
Deroy Murdock (political commentator)

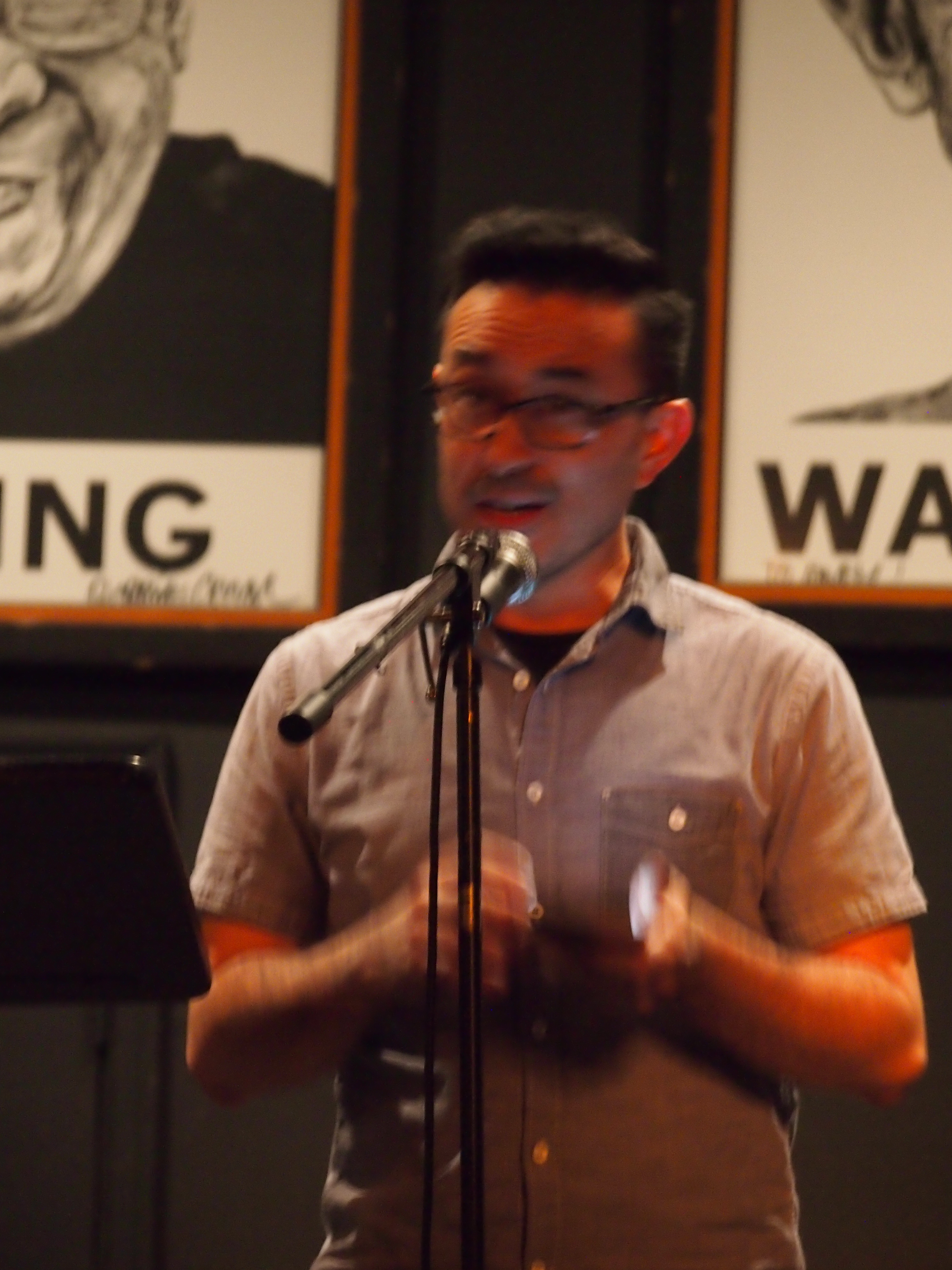
Ruben Quesada (poet)

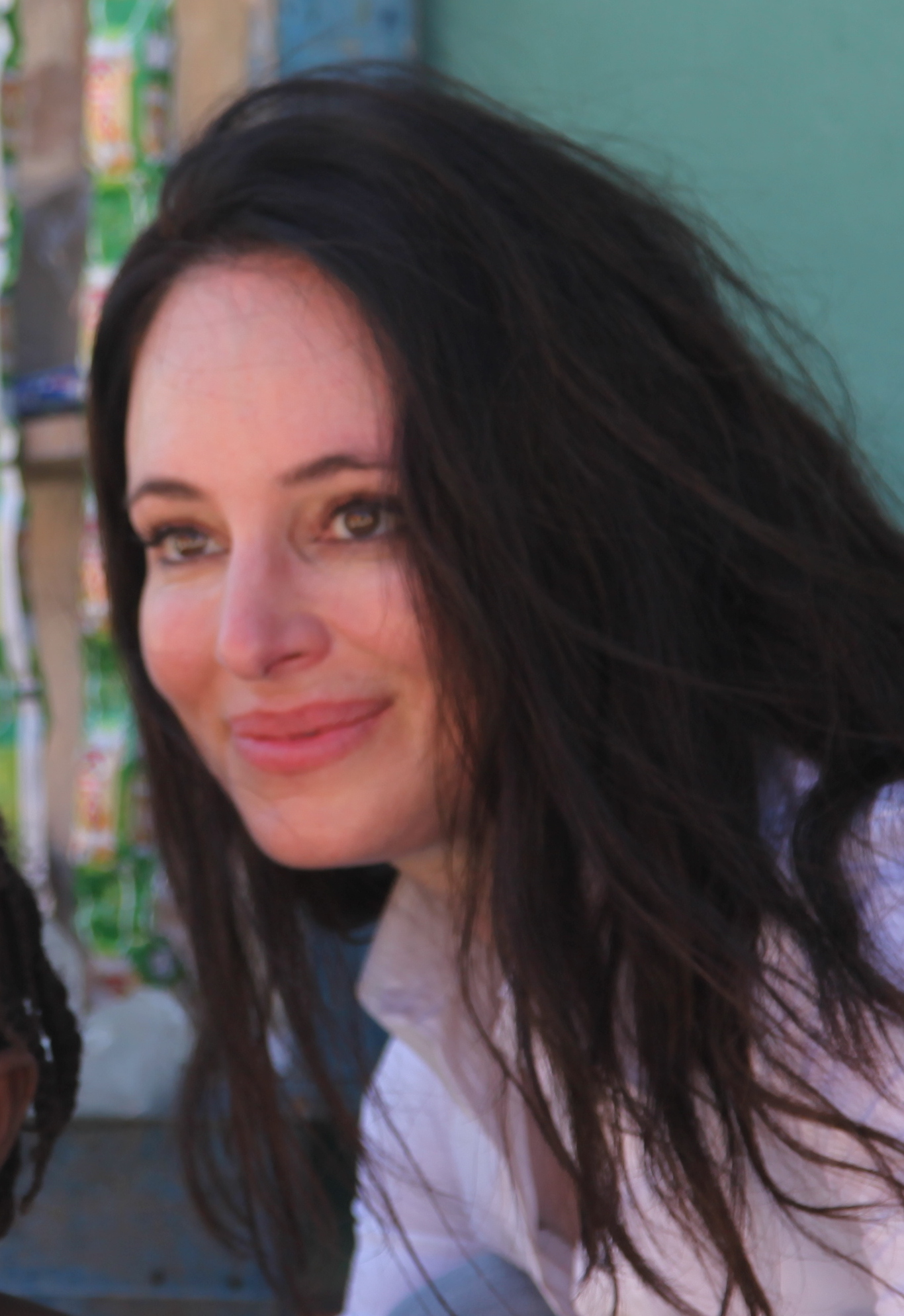
Madeleine Stowe (actor)

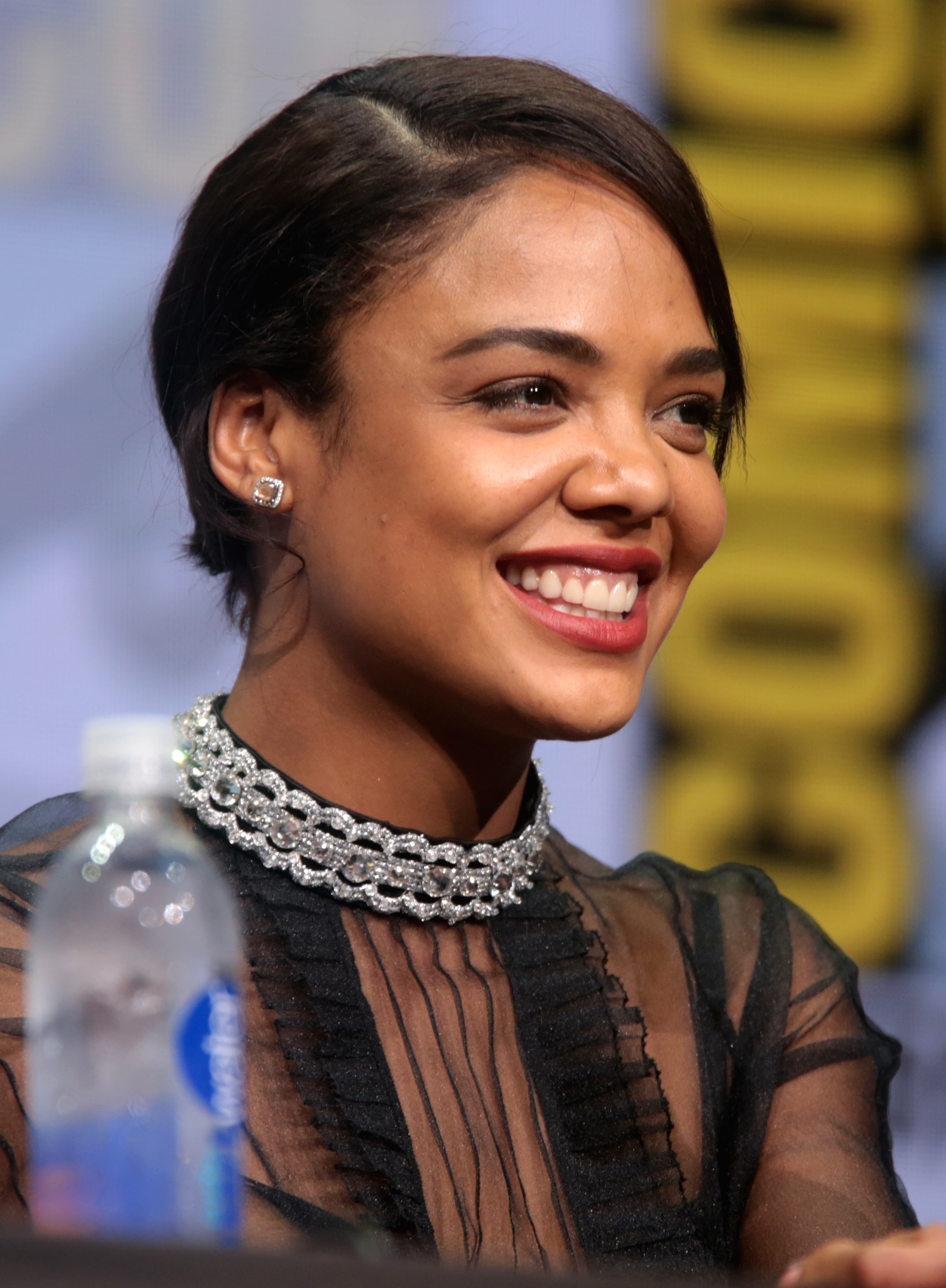
Tessa Thompson (actor)

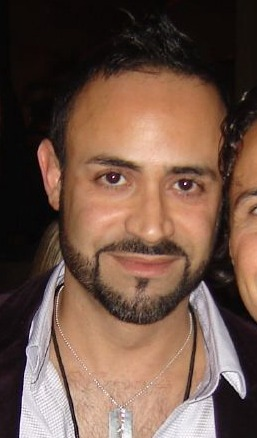
Nick Verreos (designer)

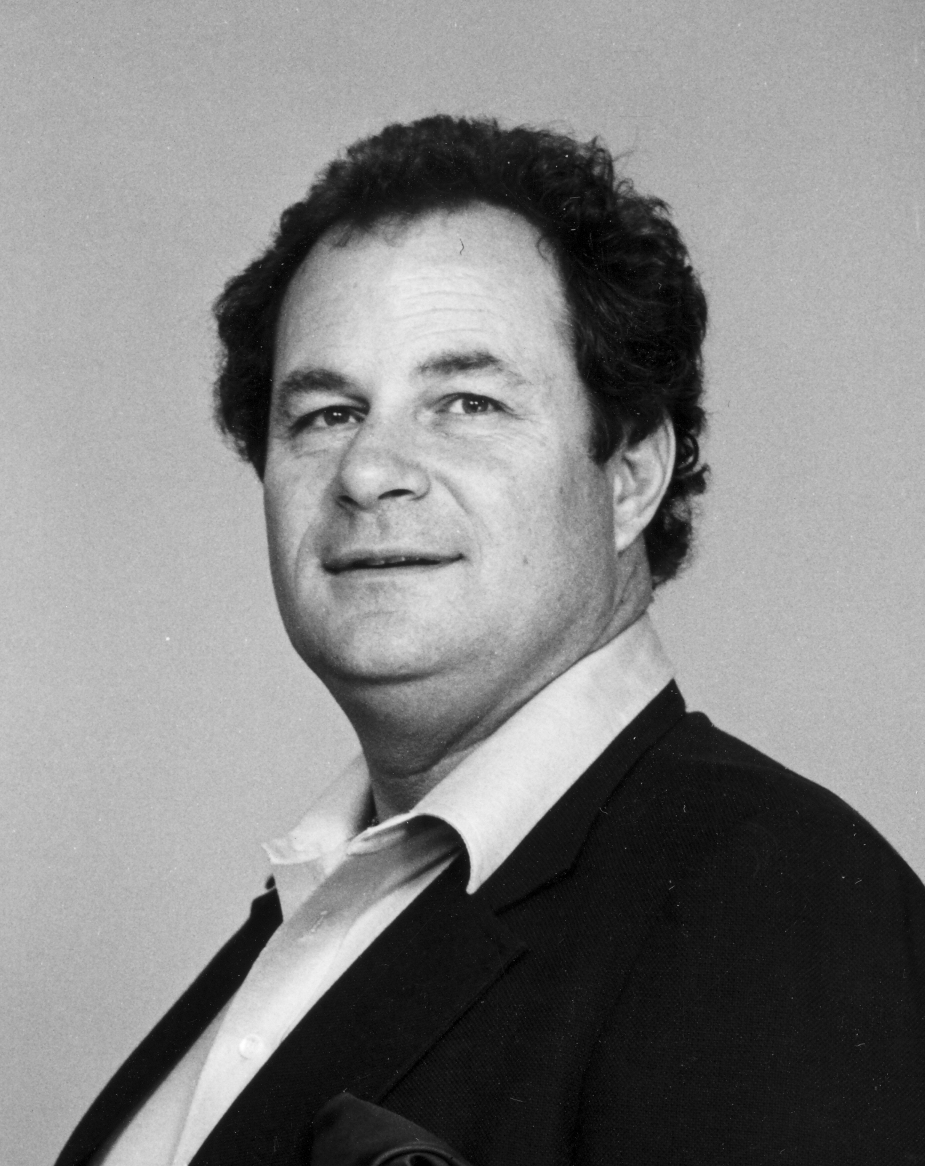
Michael Wayne (actor)

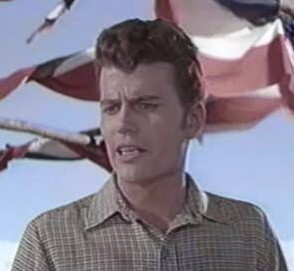
Patrick Wayne (actor)

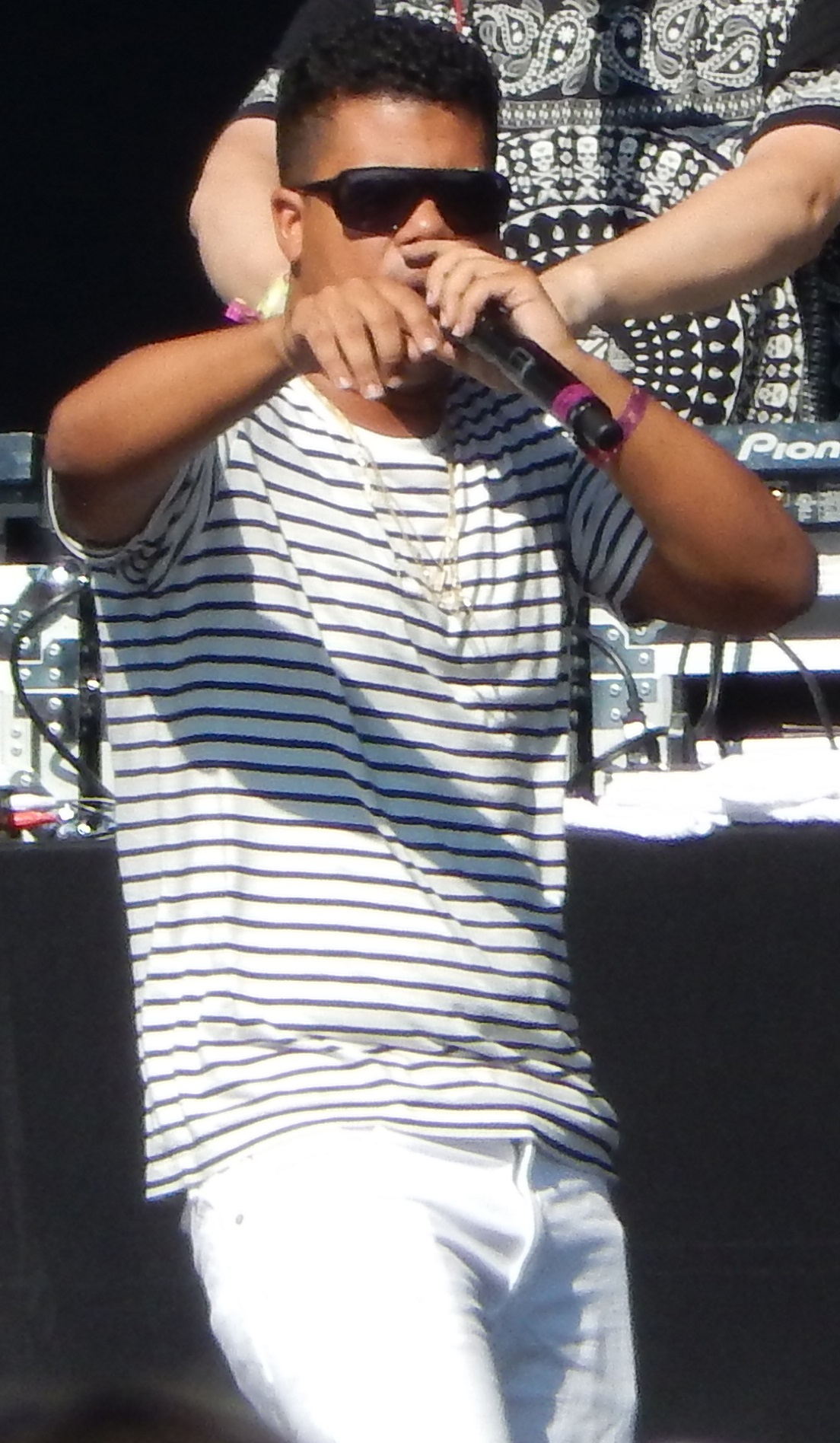
ILoveMakonnen (singer)

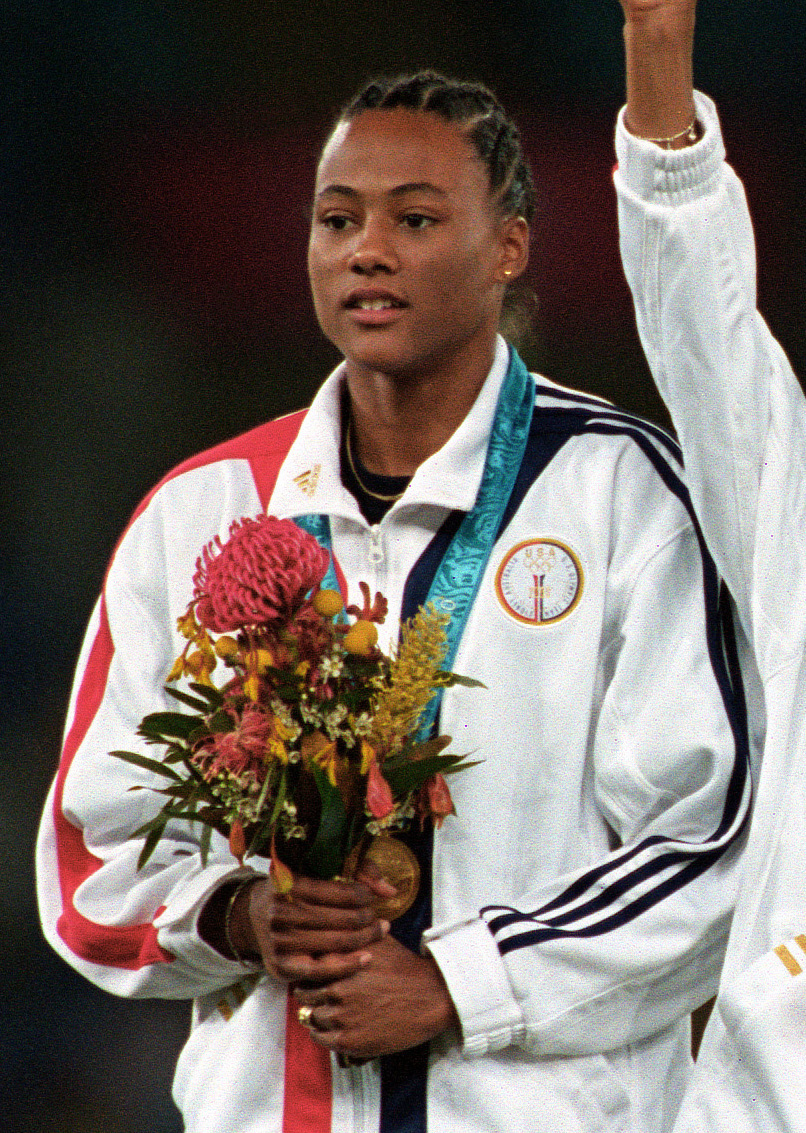
Marion Jones (athlete)

== See also ==
- Bibliography of California history
- Bibliography of Los Angeles
- Outline of the history of Los Angeles
