= El Rescate =

Community organization in Los Angeles

- Founded: 1981
- Founder: Santana Chirino Amaya Refugee Committee and the Southern California Ecumenical Council
- Type: Non-profit · Community organization · Legal aid center
- Purpose: Empower immigrants to achieve justice and civic inclusion
- Headquarters: Los Angeles, California, U.S.
- Region served: Central American refugees and Latino immigrants in Los Angeles and surrounding counties
- Services: Free legal services (asylum, TPS, DACA, VAWA, citizenship), social services, health clinic, housing aid, citizenship/civics classes, financial literacy
- Affiliations: Southern California Ecumenical Council; collaborations with human rights groups and academic partners including CSUN
- Website: www.elrescate.org

El Rescate is a nonprofit resource center and community organization based in Southern California providing free legal and social services to Central American refugees living primarily in Los Angeles and surrounding communities.

== History and purpose ==
El Rescate was founded in 1981 by members of the Santana Chirino Amaya Refugee Committee, along with the Southern California Ecumenical Council. From 1980 to 1987, between 1 and 1.5 million people in El Salvador were driven from their homeland due to the civil war and persecution by military death squads, resulting in an estimated one-tenth of the population fleeing the country. As Salvadoran refugees arrived in Los Angeles during the civil war, El Rescate began providing legal and social services. The Los Angeles-based organization opened Clínica Monseñor Romero, offering free health and medical attention. In 1987, El Rescate opened El Refugio, a transitional housing shelter for refugees. The organization incorporated legal services in addition to social services and launched the Children's Advocacy Project in 1984 to prevent family disunification and the separation of children often caused by immigration detentions.

El Rescate also responded to the 1986 earthquake in El Salvador by raising thousands of dollars for food, medical supplies, and construction materials to aid the thousands left homeless and injured. Throughout the 1980s, the organization continued to aid war-torn communities in El Salvador while serving refugees in the United States. In 1989, El Rescate led the Caravan of Material Aid, delivering $3 million worth of supplies to more than ten war-torn communities.

== Services provided ==
El Rescate has advocated changes to U.S. immigration policy and provided legal assistance to Central American immigrants. In 1991, the agency initiated its Temporary Protected Status Campaign, registering more than 60,000 individuals for permanent residency to secure political refugee status for Salvadorans. El Rescate assisted immigrants seeking residency following the settlement of the American Baptist Churches v. Thornburgh case, which challenged restrictive and discriminatory immigration policies that denied asylum to political refugees from El Salvador and Guatemala.

El Rescate advocated amendments to Nicaraguan Adjustment and Central American Relief Act (NACARA), that changed eligibility requirements for some Salvadorans and Guatemalans to become legal residents in the United States.

== Post-civil war expansion ==
After the Salvadoran Civil War ended in 1992, El Rescate began offering financial services, including small loans, remittance assistance, and workshops

The agency also offered free classes in guitar, pantomime, painting, flute, and karate.

== Legislative advocacy and community engagement ==
El Rescate works with Central American communities by providing legal representation and advice in political asylum cases. It analyzes immigration legislation and submits policy recommendations. El Rescate also offers community outreach orientation to individuals and families new to the United States and Los Angeles. In the 21st century, El Rescate sponsors community and social events and collaborates with other Salvadoran organizations to host the annual International Convention of Salvadoran Communities Residing Abroad. The organization also conducts weekly charlas (public presentations) on legal issues and maintains a website promoting community events.

El Rescate has obtained grants for technical assistance, education, and job training. The organization encourages members of the community to start small enterprises, invest in the community, and contribute to the reconstruction of El Salvador.

== Community engagement ==
Refugees have found support in learning English, volunteering, and opening various types of businesses. Others have received assistance from El Rescate in applying for temporary protected status and finding new housing after losing their homes due to a variety of factors, including the 1992 Los Angeles riots and the 1994 Northridge earthquake.

El Rescate has sponsored community forums, provided mental-health services, and supported small-business programs in the United States and El Salvador.

== Archival collections ==
In 2019, El Rescate donated its historical archives to the University Library Special Collections and Archives at California State University Northridge. This resource includes primary source material for the Index to Accountability, daily chronologies, historical photographs, reports and analysis, and Spanish and English news clippings.

== See also ==
- Central America Resource Center
- Salvadoran Civil War
