= Central America Resource Center =

Community-based organizations serving the Central American immigrant and refugee community

The Central American Resource Center (CARECEN) are two community-based organizations that seek to foster the comprehensive development of the Latino community. CARECEN in the Washington, D.C. metropolitan region was founded in 1981 to protect the rights of refugees arriving from conflict in Central America and to help ease their transition by providing legal services. CARECEN provides direct services in immigration, housing and citizenship while also promoting empowerment, civil rights advocacy and civic training for Latinos. Another CARECEN is also located in Los Angeles and was established two years after the D.C. location.

== History and mission ==
Established in 1981 and incorporated in 1982, the Central American Resource Center (CARECEN), originally named the Central American Refugee Center, was founded to protect the rights of refugees from Central America's wars and provide direct legal services that would ease their transition to their new home.

During the 1980s and 1990s, El Salvador, Nicaragua and Guatemala suffered from civil wars, while Honduras suffered more than a decade of civil strife in the form of a dirty war. This period also saw mass migration from Central America to neighboring countries, Mexico and the United States. Prior to 1980, the United States limited its recognition of refugees and asylees to those fleeing from communist governments, while the 1951 United Nations Convention and 1967 Protocol Relating to the Status of Refugees more generally accepted the definition of refugees and asylees as those fleeing their country from political oppression. The Refugee Act of 1980, signed into law by US President Jimmy Carter, established the definitions of asylum and refugee status in line with those of the United Nations. However, the United States was still in the midst of the Cold War, which strongly influenced public recognition of civil war and political oppression around the world. For example, 98% of Salvadoran requests for asylum were denied, while approximately the same percentage of Nicaraguans who claimed to be fleeing from a far leftist government was granted political asylum.

== CARECEN in Los Angeles ==
CARECEN in Los Angeles is located in the Westlake, Los Angeles neighborhood in where it was founded in 1983. While it was formed independently from CARECEN-DC, it was modeled after the DC organization. The original name of the Los Angeles CARECEN was Central American Refugee Center as it addressed the needs of the arriving refugee immigrants that hoped to get asylum certification The organization opened under its doors to the Central American community of Westlake under the leadership of Linton Joaquin as the executive director. In the 1980s, CARECEN focused primarily on garnering attention to the violence and human rights violation occurring in Central America, with a special focus on El Salvador. In 1984, CARECEN members went on a 15-day hunger strike to renounce the deportation of Salvadoran immigrants by the Reagan administration The following year, CARECEN co-counseled a class action lawsuit, Orantes-Hernandez vs. Meese which disputed the INS practices towards Salvadorans and in the process discouraging them from applying for asylum. It was not until 1988 when CARECEN gained a victory in the lawsuit as the court issued an injunction to protect the due process rights of Salvadoran refugees and have a right to seek legal asylum. In 1991, CARECEN sent two of its staff members, along with four attorneys from Gibson, Dunn, & Crtucher law firm, to investigate the massacre at El Zapote.

Under the leadership of Roberto Lovato, a Salvadoran-American, the Central American Refugee Center officially changed its name to Central American Resource Center. This shift marked the different direction that the organization took. While still catering the needs of immigrants in Los Angeles, CARECEN adapted to the new needs of immigrants whom were permanently establishing homes in Los Angeles. Its name change came along with a reshaping and addition of community services and expansion of a focus from Salvadoran immigrants to the greater Latino community. It began to place emphasis on the legal, educational, and social services geared towards the immigrant communities. In 1994, it was among the leading organizations coming together to oppose the California Proposition 187 which barred immigrants from social services. In 1996, it joined other civil rights organizations in against California Proposition 209 which threatened affirmative action in the state. Most recently, in 2006, along with other immigrant advocacy organizations such as Coalition for Humane Immigrant Rights of Los Angeles, CARECEN organized the march against the bill H.R. 4437, also known as the Sensenbrenner Bill, that would have criminalized all undocumented immigrants. CARECEN-LA continues to support the needs of the immigrant community of Los Angeles and remains expanding its services, which now include youth services & tutoring and Day labor Center, to meet the evolving needs of its constituents.

In the Legal Department, the center offers U visa and Violence Against Women Act (VAWA) services and Temporary protected status (TPS) renewals. It has recently begun processing Deferred Action for Childhood Arrivals petitions and Unaccompanied minor screening from the 2014 American immigration crisis. CARECEN also established a parent center called Centro de Padres de CARECEN "Raul G. Borbon", named after an education community activist who fought for equity and quality in the public education system of Los Angeles. In the parent center, it offers English classes to Spanish-speaking immigrants as well as a new addition called Plaza Comunitaria/Casa Universitaria that allows adults to continue their education by elementary and middle school curriculum. It has also established a Youth Center where it offers students from low income and immigrant families apply to college and a leadership program to get youth to know about organizing and civil engagement. CARECEN continues to be involved in the surrounding community through different actions and campaigns. The active campaigns that CARECEN is either spearheading or is involved with are TPS for Residency, Fix L.A., and ICE out of LA among many others.

== Central American Wars ==
The CARECEN Program of 1981, which sought to protect the rights of immigrants fleeing from their respective countries, came into effect after the influx of immigration caused by various civil wars faced by a number of Central American countries, specifically Guatemala, El Salvador and Nicaragua. In the 1950s decade, prior to the civil war era which erupted in Guatemala, a governorship of communist ideals had ruled over the country. Country leaders Jacobo Arbenz and Juan Jose Arevalo were very prominent members of the communist party that governed Guatemala. Though these leaders were democratically elected, it had become evident that communist governing strategies had become a focal point of their political agendas. Such political agendas had now caught the attention of the United States, who had recently begun assisting in destroying communist ideals in the Cold War. President Dwight D. Eisenhower advocated that the government must back the Guatemalan rebels in what is known as coup d'état which worked to overthrow the country's communist regime by instilling a right wing, authoritative and conservative governorship in Guatemala. The Guatemalan civil war was divided into several phases of violence and resistance. Through widespread human rights violations in which the people of Guatemala suffered, a three-decade long civil war erupted that spanned from 1960 to 1996. Though a peace treaty was later signed, ending the Guatemalan civil l war in the late 1990s, an influx of immigration to the United States in the prior three and a half decades became imminent as the masses fled to the United States in search of an improved environment of livability and freedom.

The 1970s found the country of El Salvador mobilized politically against a reformed government. Laborers who had been employed in the agricultural industry had embarked on a massive strike in efforts to earn more pay for their work as well as improved working conditions. As government officials became increasingly involved, the strikes were met with brutal consequences which led to violence and bloodshed with tens of thousands of Salvadorians perishing in the military led conflict. Much of the atrocities that added to the conflict included death squads which would mercilessly murder large groups of people, as well as requirement of underaged soldiers, both incredible violations of human rights. These civil conflicts and others were the cause of a substantial influx of war related death in the 1980s in El Salvador. Through all the rummage and chaos that had plagued the citizens of El Salvador, The United States became a pivotal part in aiding the Salvadorian government in keeping control against the militias. The United States bridging the presidential periods of Jimmy Carter and Ronald Reagan at times financially aided El Salvador at a makeable rate of around 50 million dollars a month. In the early 1990s a peace treaty was signed ending the conflict, but a big question was raised about the need for human rights organizations. The CARCEN program which was established in 1981 is one among many that today protects the right of the Salvadorian immigrants who are currently living in the United States.

The 1960s and 1970s in Nicaragua was the start of a very bloody revolution which was led by the Nicaraguan people against Nicaraguan right wing dictator, Anastasio Somoza. The violent outburst happened in response to the oppressive dictatorship forced upon the people of Nicaragua. The Nicaraguan revolution was responsible for taking the lives of tens of thousands of individuals and had no shortage of violence and bloodshed. The rebels, known as the Sandinista National Liberation Front, carried out a highly coveted arrangement to overthrow the dictatorship which had been in play for almost half a century. Through a number of very strategic and merciless methods of fighting, such as kidnapping and ransom, Somoza finally opted to resign his power and gave the control of the country to the Sandinistas. Although the United States did not necessarily back the rebels in their fight to overthrow their government, President Carter released around 100 million dollars to Nicaragua in aid. This came as many of the citizens of Nicaragua were living in immense poverty at the end of the regime.

== Central Americans in the United States ==
Much of the issues that Central Americans endure in the United States is well documented. Over the last few decades, immigration from Central America is grown exponentially. Programs like CARECEN have aided these migrants in fitting in to Los Angeles in efforts to give them a sense of identity and self-development in the United States. Much attention has been given to the manner in which Central American students have fared in the inner city school systems. While many flourish in their new schools, the dropout rates exceed the national average. According to HPDP, the year 1982 saw a dropout rate of 11.4% of Central American migrants. Many of the students who do graduate, continue to college or pursue a job in the workforce. With the help of CARECEN many of the Central American migrants have a higher chance in securing a job and receiving legal aid if necessary. The program also gives many of its members a platform to do volunteer work as they please to help the community with any issues that may arise. There are currently roughly 600,000 Central Americans living in Los Angeles while there are roughly 3,500,000 million Central Americans countrywide.

== See also ==
- Hispanics in Washington, D.C.
- Office of Latino Affairs of the District of Columbia
- Latin American Youth Center
- Central American crisis
- Central America solidarity movement
- Nicaraguan Revolution
- Salvadoran Civil War
- Guatemalan Revolution
- Sanctuary movement
- Contras
- Nicaragua v. United States
- Liberation theology
- El Rescate
