= Young Playwrights' Theater =

Theater arts organization in Washington, D.C., USA

- Formation: 1995
- Type: Theatre group
- Purpose: Arts education
- Location: 2437 15th St NW Washington, DC 20009
- Website: www.yptdc.org

Young Playwrights' Theater (YPT) is a not-for-profit theater arts-based education organization in Northwest Washington, D.C. It provides interactive in-school and after-school programs presenting and discussing student-written work to promote community dialogue and respect for young artists.

== History and leadership ==
Young Playwrights' Theater was founded in 1995 by Karen Zacarías. Now a Helen Hayes Award-winning Playwright-in-Residence at Arena Stage, Zacarías began volunteering her time teaching playwriting workshops in DC classrooms after returning to her hometown with a M.F.A. in playwriting from Boston University. By 1997, her workshops were so successful that she incorporated YPT as a 501c3 nonprofit organization.

In 2005, when Zacarías transitioned to Arena Stage, David Andrew Snider took over as Producing Artistic Director and CEO. Since then the organization has grown to employ six full-time staff members, eight professional teaching artists, and dozens of professional actors, directors and designers supporting its work on-stage and in the classroom. YPT provides thousands of students and community members annually with free in-school and after-school theater arts workshops and professional performances of student-written plays, and has created a continuum of programming at the Columbia Heights Education Campus through programming for students of Bancroft Elementary School, Lincoln Middle School and Bell Multicultural High School to gauge the long-term effects on students as they progress.

Snider followed Zacarías to Arena Stage in July 2012 as Director of Artistic Programming. Former Deputy Director Brigitte Pribnow Moore stepped in as Acting Executive Director and former Program Manager Nicole Jost assumed the role of Associate Artistic Director. YPT's staff operates out of the Josephine Butler Parks Center, adjacent to Meridian Hill Park in the Columbia Heights neighborhood and regularly stages performances at nearby Tivoli Theatre, a renovated 1920's Italian Renaissance Revival theater, now home to GALA Hispanic Theatre. The organization receives federal and private sector funding, as well as individual donations.

== Programs and performance series ==
=== In-School Playwriting Program ===
YPT's flagship program integrates the art of playwriting into the classroom in order to enhance student literacy, creative expression and communication. During 12 in-class workshops led by teaching artists, students explore the mechanics of language, drama, and self-expression, culminating with each student writing his or her own short play. Professional actors and directors visit the classroom throughout the process, reading students' plays and helping to bring their words to life. The most dynamic plays are chosen by a reading committee composed of professional playwrights, directors, and actors, to be performed at Tivoli Theatre by YPT's acting company in the New Play Festival and at satellite locations during the New Writers Now! series. The young authors work with a dramaturge to polish their scripts, attend rehearsals, and offer input to actors and a director during their plays' development and production. In 2012, YPT published some of the best student works.

=== Out-of-School Time Programming ===
Since 2008, YPT has hosted an after-school Young Playwrights' Workshop at its facilities in the Josephine Butler Parks Center, aimed at developing students' creative expression and collaboration by exploring theater as an ensemble. Students have written plays and performed them at the Capital Fringe Festival, Intersections at Atlas Performing Arts Center, the Source Festival and Tivoli Theatre. The workshop hosted arts delegations from China and Russia in 2012. Several schools host YPT's After-School Playwrighting Program, providing a similar collaborative, explorative writing and performance experience. Additionally, the Summer Playwriting Series, a series of playwriting workshops for local youth, is conducted at partner schools, camps and community centers, culminating in community sharing and staged readings.

=== Express Tour ===
Each fall, YPT's professional acting company tours the Greater Washington, D.C. area performing student-written plays at schools, nursing homes, hospitals, community centers and theaters, free of charge. Plays are selected from the previous school year to align with an overarching theme chosen for that year's tour. Audiences participate with actors in post-performance interactive workshops to develop their own artistic interpretations and customized storytelling experiences. The tour usually concludes with a public showcase performance at Tivoli Theatre.

=== Special Projects ===
YPT has received commissions and enjoyed partnerships with regional and international institutions including the White House, Kennedy Center, National Geographic Society, Smithsonian Institution's Discovery Theater, Folger Shakespeare Library, Woolly Mammoth, Carnegie Institute, Theater J, Round House Theatre, African Continuum, Busboys and Poets, Washington Parks and People, Capitol Hill Arts Workshop (CHAW), the Canadian Embassy, EsArtes of Suchitoto, El Salvador, and a Youth Village in Israel.

== Evaluations and assessments ==
Written literacy evaluations and self-assessments are conducted during initial and final workshop visits at program sites, and assessment results are judged via a specific rubric developed by YPT's outside evaluator, faculty and staff, aimed at showing the changes in students' literacy, their abilities with language and addressing District of Columbia Public Schools and national English Language Arts Standards, as well as measurable changes in attitude/engagement in their own education. The President's Committee on the Arts and Humanities and the National Endowment for the Arts have called on YPT to share their successful evaluations and assessments to advance the field of arts education on a national level.

== Recognition ==
YPT has received several regional and national awards, most notably the 2006 District of Columbia Mayor's Arts Award for Outstanding Contribution to Arts Education, a 2009 Helen Hayes nomination for Best New Play for Chasing George Washington: A White House Adventure, the Eugene and Agnes Meyer Foundation 2009 Exponent Award, the 2010 National Arts and Humanities Youth Program Award (formerly the Coming Up Taller Award), the HandsOn Greater DC Cares Essence of Leadership Award in 2011 and Community Impact Award in 2012, recognition in the 2009-2010 Catalogue for Philanthropy, and most recently an honorable mention for The Washington Post 2012 Award for Excellence in Nonprofit Management. YPT is a member of the League of Washington Theaters and the Theatre Communications Group.

== See also ==
- Theatre in Washington, D.C.
- Tivoli Theatre (Washington, D.C.)
- GALA Hispanic Theatre
- Howard Theatre
- Bell Multicultural High School
- Smithsonian Institution
