= Knickerbocker Theatre =

Knickerbocker Theatre may refer to:

- Knickerbocker Theatre (Broadway), demolished in 1930
- Knickerbocker Theatre (Washington, D.C.), whose roof collapsed in 1922
