= Karen Zacarias =

Mexican-American playwright

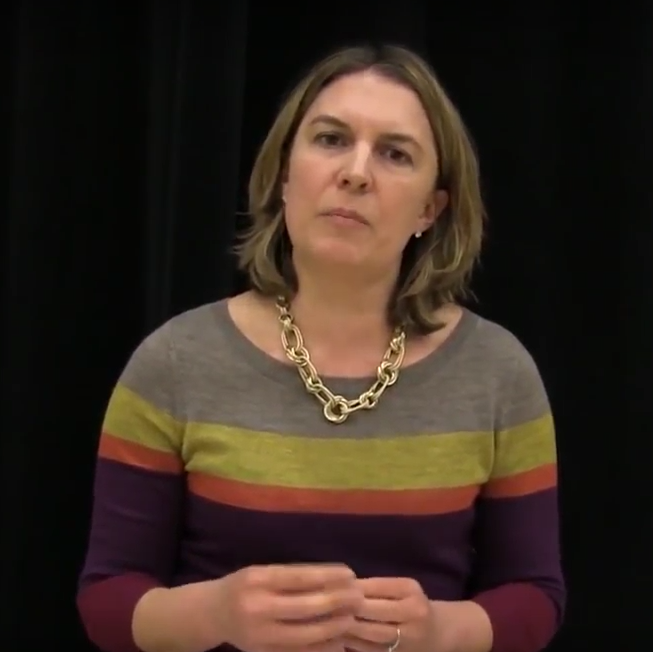
- Zacarias in 2013
- Born: 1969 (age 56–57); Mexico
- Occupation: Playwright

Karen Zacarías is an American playwright. She is known for her play Mariela in the Desert. It was the winner of the National Latino Playwriting Award and a finalist for other prizes. Mariela in the Desert was debuted at the Goodman Theatre in Chicago. Zacarías is the founder of the Young Playwrights' Theater located in Washington, D.C.

== Early life ==
Zacarías received her Bachelors in Arts from Stanford University in 1991 and then went on to pursue her Masters in Creative Writing at Boston University in 1995. Zacarías comes from an artistic family from Mexico. Her grandfather, Miguel Zacarías, was a movie director and writer during the Golden Age of Mexican cinema in the 1930s and 1940s. Zacarías initially resisted pursuing an artistic career. She said:

Ours was a wonderful, lively, enchanting artistic house, but it also demystified "art" for me. I saw firsthand how "artistic expression" could be misused as a justification for self-indulgent, self-important and destructive behavior, and consequently I resisted being an artist for many years. It wasn't until I was out of college, had worked a couple of years at a Latin American policy nonprofit and knew I could support myself without betraying others that I finally let myself really become a writer.

== Career ==
She was the first playwright-in-residence at the Arena Stage in Washington, D.C.

She has written several plays, including The Book Club Play, Legacy of Light, Mariela in the Desert, The Sins of Sor Juana, The Sun Also Rises and adaptations of plays such as How the Garcia Girls Lost Their Accents, Just Like Us and others. Theaters that have showcased her plays include the Kennedy Center, Arena Stage, Goodman Theatre, Round House Theatre, Denver Center for the Performing Arts, Alliance Theatre, Imagination Stage (Bethesda, Maryland), Cincinnati Playhouse in the Park, Oregon Shakespeare Festival, GALA Hispanic Theatre, Berkshire Theatre Festival, South Coast Repertory, La Jolla Playhouse, Cleveland Play House, San Jose Repertory Theatre, GEVA Theater, Horizon Theater, People's Light and Theatre, Walnut Street Theater, Arden Theater, Milagro Theater, Teatro Vista, and Aurora Theater.

Zacarías was invited by the White House Historical Association and the John F. Kennedy Center for the Performing Arts to write a family play about the White House. She included young people in the process and her script was converted into a book published by Scholastic. It included a foreword by First Lady Michelle Obama. The book was called Chasing George Washington and the musical premiered at The Kennedy Center for Performing Arts and was followed by a national tour.

Zacarías established and founded the Young Playwrights' Theater in 1995. She began by volunteering and teaching playwriting classes to children in D.C. classrooms, and they grew so popular that she turned it into a 501c3 nonprofit organization by 1997. She is also the founder of the Latino Theatre Commons.

She has been inspired by works from María Irene Fornés, Caryl Churchill, Sarah Ruhl, Lisa Loomer, Lisa Kron and Julia Cho. Writing for young people is very important for Zacarías. She says:

"I love writing for young people. You can't find a more honest and challenging audience on the planet. My strongest playwriting lessons have come in trying to create stories that will resonate with young people—it is a rewarding, hilarious and heartbreaking endeavor to create plays in which kids really see themselves on stage."

== Personal life ==
She lives in Washington, D.C., with her husband, Rett Snotherly, and their three children.

== Awards ==
The Sins of Sor Juana was the winner of the Charles MacArthur Award for outstanding new play at D.C.'s 2000 Helen Hayes Awards. This play has been widely produced, thus Zacarías translated it for a Spanish-language production in April at D.C.'s GALA Hispanic Theatre.

Young Playwrights' Theater won the 2010 National Arts and Humanities Youth Program Award from the President's Committee on the Arts and Humanities. YPT received the Washington Post 2014 Award for Excellence in Nonprofit Management.

Her other awards include:

- New Voices Award
- 2010 Steinberg Citation-Best New Play
- Paul Aneillo Award
- Francesca Primus Prize for an Emerging Woman Theater Artist
- National Latino Play Award
- Finalist, Susan Blackburn
- 2000 Helen Hayes Award for Outstanding New Play (Sins of Sor Juana)
- 2018 Helen Hayes Award for Outstanding Original Play or Musical Adaptation (Ella Enchanted)
- In 2022, Zacarías was named by Carnegie Corporation of New York as an honoree of the Great Immigrants Award.

== Works ==
- The Sins of Sor Juana (1999)
- Mariela in the Desert (2005)
- How the Garcia Girls Lost Their Accents (2008)
- The Book Club Play (2009)
- Legacy of Light (2009)
- Just Like Us (2013)
  - Adapted from Helen Thorpe's 2009 book of the same name, it premiered in 2013 at The Stage Theatre in Denver, Colorado.
- Our War (2014)
  - Zacarías contributed one of 25 vignettes.
- Destiny of Desire: A Brechtian Telenovela (2015)
  - Premiered in 2015 at Arena Stage directed by Jose Luis Valenzuela and under his directorship went on to the Goodman Theatre and South Coast Repertory.
- Into the Beautiful North (2016)
  - Inspired by Luis Alberto Urrea's 2009 book of the same name, it premiered in 2016 at Miracle Theatre in Portland, Oregon and has toured around the U.S.
- Native Gardens (2019)
- The Copper Children (2020)
  - Premiered in 2020 at the Oregon Shakespeare Festival.
- The Age of Innocence (2024)
  - Commissioned and world premiered by San Diego's Old Globe Theatre.

== TYA musicals ==
Zacarías' musicals with composer Deborah Wicks La Puma include:

- OLIVÉRio: A Brazilian Twist (Kennedy Center)
- Ella Enchanted (First Stage Milwaukee/Adventure Theatre MTC)
- Jane of the Jungle (South Coast Repertory)
- Frida Libre (La Jolla Playhouse)
- Looking for Roberto Clemente (Imagination Stage)
- Chasing George Washington: A White House Adventure (Kennedy Center)
- Einstein is a Dummy (Alliance Theatre)
- Cinderella Eats Rice and Beans (Imagination Stage)
- Ferdinand the Bull (Imagination Stage)
- The Magical Piñata (Imagination Stage)

== See also ==
- Theater of the United States
