= Hugo Medrano =

Director, playwright, and actor

- Occupations: Director; playwright; actor
- Organization: GALA Hispanic Theatre
- Spouse: Rebecca Read Medrano

Hugo Medrano is an Argentinian-born theatre director, playwright, and actor. He co-founded the GALA Hispanic Theatre in Washington D.C., with his wife Rebecca Read Medrano. The GALA Hispanic Theatre features Spanish and Latin American plays and has staged over 220 productions since its founding in 1976. Hugo Medrano serves as the theatre's Founding Producing Artistic Director. He received the Helen Hayes Award for Outstanding Lead Actor for his role as Molina in El Beso de la Mujer Arana in 1994. For promoting Spanish culture in the United States, Medrano received Spain's Order of Queen Isabella.

== Early life and education ==
Hugo Medrano lived in Argentina for much of his early life. He attended Escuela de Teatro de La Plata and graduated with a bachelor's degree in theatre. Shortly after graduation, Medrano fled political violence as a result of Argentina's Dirty War which targeted left-wing political dissidents. He reported that many of his friends were some of the students, intellectuals, and artists who disappeared as a result of the war. These experiences inspired the political themes of Medrano's early work.

Medrano continued his studies in Spain at the Teatro Estudio de Madrid. He lived and performed in Spain for five years before immigrating to the United States.

== Career ==
Medrano's career in the United States began at Teatro Doble, a bilingual children's theatre located in Washington D.C. However, most of his notable work was done with the GALA Hispanic Theatre. GALA stands for Grupo de Artistas Latino Americanos. Medrano co-founded this theatre in 1976 to deliver quality plays to the growing Spanish-speaking community of Washington. In its early years, the GALA Hispanic Theatre performed in a townhouse in the multicultural Adams Morgan neighborhood of the city. Medrano produced and directed the group's first production, La Fiaca by Ricardo Talesnik, which received recognition by the Washington Post. Medrano would go on to direct, produce, and act in a multitude of successful productions over the next 40 years.

As a theatre director at GALA, Medrano faced challenges concerning the bilingual nature of his productions. To appeal to both Spanish-speaking and English-speaking audiences, Medrano would often present two different productions of the same play, an English version and a Spanish version. In some cases, this would require two different actors, costumes, or directors to perform these productions. Medrano found this approach to be inefficient, and the GALA Hispanic Theatre subsequently transitioned to producing plays in Spanish and providing English subtitles or headphone translations to the audience.

Moving the GALA Hispanic Theatre to a permanent home in the Tivoli Theatre of Columbia Heights was an important moment in Medrano's career. The Tivoli Theatre was built in 1924 and quickly became a city landmark as both a theatre and a cinema. The theatre was abandoned in 1976 but was restored with the help of a $4 million fundraising campaign started by Medrano and others. In 2005, the GALA Hispanic Theatre officially moved into the Tivoli Theatre and Medrano began to work on new projects. With the help of his wife, Medrano created the National Center for Latino Performing Arts and has expanded GALA's focus to include concerts, dance, film, and other arts.

== Notable productions ==
=== In the Heights ===
In the Heights is a Tony Award winning broadway musical which featured music and lyrics by Lin-Manuel Miranda. In 2017, Hugo Medrano and the GALA Hispanic Theatre hosted the first all Spanish version of the production in the United States. The musical is usually performed in Spanglish, a mix of Spanish and English.

== Awards ==
Hugo Medrano was recognized as a "Visionary" by the Mayor's Arts Awards in 2014. He also received an Immigrant Achievement Award from the American Immigration Council in 2014. In 2010, both Hugo Medrano and his wife Rebecca Read Medrano were named Washingtonians of the Year by the Washingtonian magazine.
