= Ambassador Theater (Washington, D.C.) =

- Interactive map of Ambassador Theater
- Former names: Knickerbocker Theatre

General information
- Status: Demolished
- Type: Theater
- Architectural style: Georgian Revival
- Location: 2454 18th Street and Columbia Road, NW, Washington, D.C., Washington, D.C., United States
- Coordinates: 38.9221261°N 77.0424065°W
- Year built: 1915
- Closed: January 10, 1968

The Ambassador Theater was a theater located at 2454 18th Street and Columbia Road, NW, Washington, D.C. It was most notable for a six-month period in the 1960s when it was a psychedelic concert and dance hall.

== History ==
The Ambassador was located at 2454 18th Street and Columbia Road, NW and was on the site where the Knickerbocker Theater once stood. The Knickerbocker Theatre was designed by Reginald Geare and built in 1915 for Harry Crandall, who owned a small chain of theaters in Washington. It had a curved, three-story facade of limestone on red brick in a Georgian Revival style and seated 1,700. On January 22, 1922, 98 people were killed and 136 injured, when the roof of the Knickerbocker collapsed under the weight of thirty inches of snow in what was then the worst disaster in Washington. In 1923, Thomas Lamb built a new theater in the shell of the Knickerbocker, retaining the facade, which would be called the Ambassador. By the 1950s, the Ambassador was struggling to compete with television and was suffering from low attendance.

In the 1960s, three men in their early 20s, Joel Mednick, Anthony Finestra and Court Rodgers were selling fire extinguishers on college campuses across the country when they decided to go see what was happening in San Francisco. Inspired by the psychedelic scene and dance halls, they came back to DC and decided to open their own dance hall. The first site the three tried to get was a streetcar barn at K Street and Wisconsin Ave, NW, which they named The Psychedelic Power and Light Company. However, the District police would not issue a license for the use of the building. After being turned down they went after the Ambassador Theater. The captain of that ward mailed out letters to all the area merchants that stated that, "The Psychedelic Power and Light Company was moving into the neighborhood with drugs, long hair and loud music."

It frightened the residents in the area and some of the merchants wrote letters to the police department asking them to deny a permit to the owners. The Ambassador group had to cancel the Grateful Dead, who were booked for June 15, 1967, after posters were already made and equipment was already trucked in. On June 29, 1967, The Washington Star said "the hippies and the not so hip tangled over whether a total involvement teenage night spot should open or not in Washington". By the time of the meeting, Finestra, Rodgers and Mednick decided not to change the name, instead just leaving it as The Ambassador Theater.

The trio for the Ambassador was backed by some of the local ministers and a decision was promised by July 12. On July 13, 1967, the owners got their permits. During that time, the trio had lost thousands of dollars. They had already booked and lost the Grateful Dead and The Doors, plus paid the rent on the Ambassador. The Washington Star wrote, "It will be the city's first way out dance hall".

Showgoers at the Ambassador were broken down into three groups: Petal, or children under 15, Flower Children for those 15–30, and Old Flowers for those over 30. The theater had three large screens with 11 projectors to run short films. Three separate slide projectors were used with rotating trays of colored water that were projected on the screens. There were also strobe lights and fans to give dancers a slow motion effect. A stand offered attendees beads, water pipes, psychedelic posters, and underground newspapers. There were a few church pews for seating and also flowers painted on the floor.

The grand opening was on July 27, 1967, with the Peanut Butter Conspiracy and the Mandrake Memorial. The Daily News wrote about the Ambassador on opening night, "Our town's answer to New York's Electric Circus opens tonight." There were more than 1000 hippies there on opening night. An elderly woman from the neighborhood said, "I wouldn't give two cents to see somebody called The Peanut Butter Conspiracy". Tickets were $2.50 each and it was opened from 8:30 pm to 1 am. Sandi Robinson of the Peanut Butter Conspiracy said, "As far as what the Ambassador is trying to follow is groovy." She added that, "[the] Ambassador has a good light show."

In August 1967 The Jimi Hendrix Experience performed from Wednesday the 9th through Sunday the 13th. There may have been 100 people in attendance for the first show. Tickets were $1.50 on Wednesday, Thursday and Friday. They went up to $2.50 for the shows on Saturday and Sunday. Shows consisted of two sets of about one hour each. Between sets the band members jumped off the front of the stage to the dance floor and went into the lobby for popcorn, returning to the stage the same way they exited. They finished the last set by setting a Fender Stratocaster on fire.

On January 10, 1968, the equipment was moved out and the Ambassador officially shut down. It closed because of insufficient funds, but before closing it tried hosting soul music acts without success. Former employees said It closed because of the uptight people of DC. Patrons of the theater faced police harassment, such as receiving parking tickets on legally parked cars and waiting at the exit doors to cite teenagers for violating curfews. According to one of the local newspapers on January 11, 1968, "The psychedelic night spot drops out." On September 29, 1969, the Ambassador Theater fell to the wrecking ball. Many residents felt it had been standing too long then. In July 1974, the land where the Ambassador Theater stood was sold to a land investor in the Adams Morgan area. A bank was constructed on the site in 1978.

On Saturday, November 3, 2007, a 40th anniversary reunion and panel discussion took place in Washington, D.C., as part of the DC Historical Studies Conference. Almost a hundred attended, including founders Joel Mednick and Court Rodgers (Tony Finestra died in 1991), as well as Jerry Marmelstein, Michael Paper, Michael Schreibman, Richard Harrington and Anne Groer (both from The Washington Post). It was moderated by filmmaker Jeff Krulik.
