= Legacy of Light =

Play by Karen Zacarias

Legacy of Light is a play by Karen Zacarias that explores the similarities and differences between the lives of women scientists in the 1700s and the present day. Karen Zacarias is a playwright-in-residence for the Arena Stage in Washington D.C., where her contemporary comedy premiered on May 8, 2009. Legacy of Light shows two different worlds and the themes that connect them, including the properties of love and light, motherhood, and career vs family. Along with connecting two different time periods, Karen has connect two different types of characters. The play features an ensemble of six characters that include two historical figures: Emilie du Châtelet and Voltaire.

== Synopsis ==
=== Act 1 ===
The play begins France during the 1700s, minutes after Saint-Lambert and Emilie have had relations. Voltaire enters and engages in a sword fight with Saint-Lambert. After Saint-Lambert exits, Voltaire shares his feelings for Emilie and his disdain for Emilie’s relations with Lambert. The next scene is set in modern-day New Jersey, as Olivia has—potentially—discovered a new planet. Olivia reveals to her husband Peter that she wants to try having a baby again. An expository aside to the audience identifies the historical characters of Voltaire and Emilie. Millie meets with Peter and Olivia about Millie's being a surrogate mother. Olivia reveals that she has survived late stage ovarian cancer, which is why she can’t get pregnant. Millie tells the couple that she wants to do something that matters in life, and believes that making Olivia a mother will do just that; the money she will be paid will help her go to fashion design school in Paris. The scene shifts back to the 1700s, as Emile tells Saint-Lambert that she is expecting his child; however, he cannot stay with her because he must go write for the king. Pauline and Voltaire enter and talk about Voltaire’s new play. Back in New York, Olivia talks to the Board of Directors and patrons of her institute about the planet she may have discovered. Millie has told her brother Lewis that she is going to be a surrogate mother for Peter and Olivia. Millie shares the real reason she is going through the surrogacy, which is to save her family home from being foreclosed. Lewis is not at all happy about Millie’s decision. Voltaire discovers that Emilie is pregnant and is angered by the situation Emilie has gotten into, while Emilie is afraid of dying before she has achieved all that she can. Millie has a sonogram, which Olivia missed because of her work; the couple decides that they will wait to find out the baby's gender. Voltaire talks about Isaac Newton and his story about the apple that explains gravity. Monsieur du Chatelet returns home with a gift for Pauline, which turns out to be fabric for Pauline to make her wedding dress. Emilie has gone back on her promise to Pauline, for Pauline to study in Paris, and now she must wed instead. Emilie shares her discovery about the properties of light and wonders if light and love have similar properties.

=== Act 2 ===
Act two begins as Olivia gives a presentation to a girl scout troop. She is about to get caught up in her work and miss another doctor’s appointment, so she cuts her presentation short and leaves early to make the appointment. Millie is now seven months pregnant. Millie and Lewis discuss plans for the future of their family home: Lewis wants to keep it, while Millie thinks the house is a burden on her and her brother. Emilie has written a paper that is contradictory to Newton’s ideas, and tells Voltaire just how important her work is to her. They talk about what will happen if Emilie dies during childbirth. Emilie shares her new discovery, in which forces cancel each other out in a collision. Millie is now cleaning everything that she can in her house; Olivia enters and the two share a moment when the baby kicks. Peter and Lewis soon enter. Lewis punches Peter in the face, while expressing his disdain for his sister's surrogacy; in his anger he reveals that Millie was doing this to save the house and that she wasn’t really going to school. Olivia has a breakdown and runs out of the room. Emilie gives birth to her baby, which is very small. Pauline enters and she is wearing her wedding dress. Emilie tells Pauline that she will no longer have to wed. The ensemble exits except for Voltaire who gives a soliloquy about the future of the characters: Emilie’s death, the baby’s death, Pauline’s marriage, and his own future. The two worlds merge, as Olivia is hiding in a tree when she and Voltaire discuss science and scientific theories. Voltaire offers Olivia some advice: she may be more of the father figure then the mother. Millie storms on stage searching for Olivia, and reveals that the child is a girl. Millie’s water breaks, so Olivia and Millie exit while Voltaire is left in the tree. Peter enters, searching for Olivia. He is struck by lightning and dies. In his death, he talks to Emilie, who saves him. Peter exits and Saint-Lambert enters. Marquis du Chatelet enters and informs Saint-Lambert of the grave news of Emilie's death, then punches Saint-Lambert in the face. Emilie re-enters and is soon followed by Lewis, who asks if they speak French. Emilie finds out the Lewis and Millie are distant relatives. Millie has had the baby, whom they decide to name Pauline. Lewis enters, gives Millie flowers and a letter she received in the mail. Emilie enters the hospital room and convinces Millie to open the letter. The letter is an acceptance to the fashion design school in Paris.

== Character descriptions ==
EMILIE du CHÂTELET: Beautiful intelligent woman, a scientist. Age 42

VOLTAIRE: Emilie’s lover; Playwright and scientist-wannabe. Age 54

SAINT-LAMBERT: Emilie’s handsome younger lover.

LEWIS: Millie's older brother.

OLIVIA: Modern professional woman. A scientist. Age 42.

WET NURSE: Wet Nurse to Emilie's baby.

MILLIE: Modern 21-year-old woman of Italian descent.

PAULINE: Daughter of Emilie and Monsieur du Châtelet

PETER: Olivia’s husband. Age 44.

MONSIEUR DU CHÂTELET: Emile's husband.

The roles of Saint-Lambert and Lewis, Olivia and Wet Nurse, and Peter and Monsieur du Châtelet are traditionally played by the same actors. The script is written in a way that these characters are never on stage at the same time, so that one actor can play two parts.

== Productions ==
=== World premiere ===
Legacy of Light had its world premiere at the Arena Stage in Washington D.C. It opened on May 8, 2009 and showed through June 14, 2009.

Cast
Emilie du Chatelet	Lise Bruneau
Olivia/Wet Nurse	Carla Harting
Voltaire	Stephen Schnetzer
Peter/Marquis du Chatelet	Michael Russotto
St. Lambert/Lewis	David Covington
Pauline/Millie	Lindsey Kyler

Creative Team
Director	Molly Smith
Set Design	Marjorie Bradley Kellogg
Costume Design	Linda Cho
Lighting Design	Michael Gilliam
Souza Design/Composer	Andre J. Pluess
Dramaturg	Jocelyn Clarke
Stage Manager	Susan R. White

=== West Coast premiere ===
Legacy of Light had its premiere on the west coast at the San Jose Repertory theater on March 24, 2011. It ran through April 17, 2011.

Cast
Emilie di Chatelet	Rachel Harker
Olivia/Wet Nurse	Carrie Paff
Voltaire	Robert Yacko
Peter/Marquis du Chatelet	Mike Ryan
St. Lambert/Lewis	Miles Gaston Villanueva
Pauline/Millie	Kathryn Tkel

Creative Team
Director	Kristen Brandt
Set Design	William Bloodgood
Costume Design	Brandin Baron
Sound Design/Composer	Jeff Mockus
Fight Director	Dave Maier

== Awards ==
Legacy of Light was the winner of the Steinberg Citation in 2010. The Steinberg award is given out annually for the best new scripts that were produced and premiered at a professional level outside of New York. The award includes a commemorative plaque and 25,000 dollars. Karen Zacarias won the citation, which included 7,500 dollars and a commemorative plaque.
