= Apollo Theater (Washington, D.C.) =

Movie theater in Washington, D.C

Coordinates: 38°54′2.4″N 76°59′51.0″W

- Industry: movie theatre
- Founded: 1933
- Headquarters: Washington, D.C.
- Key people: A. Clark Jones; W.B. Avery

The Apollo Theater was a movie theater located at 624 H Street NE in Washington, D.C. which played silent movies. It was built in 1913 and was part of the Crandall network of movie theaters popular at the time. It was demolished in 1955. The lot is today occupied by a residential building named the "Apollo" in its honor.

== History ==
=== Heyday ===
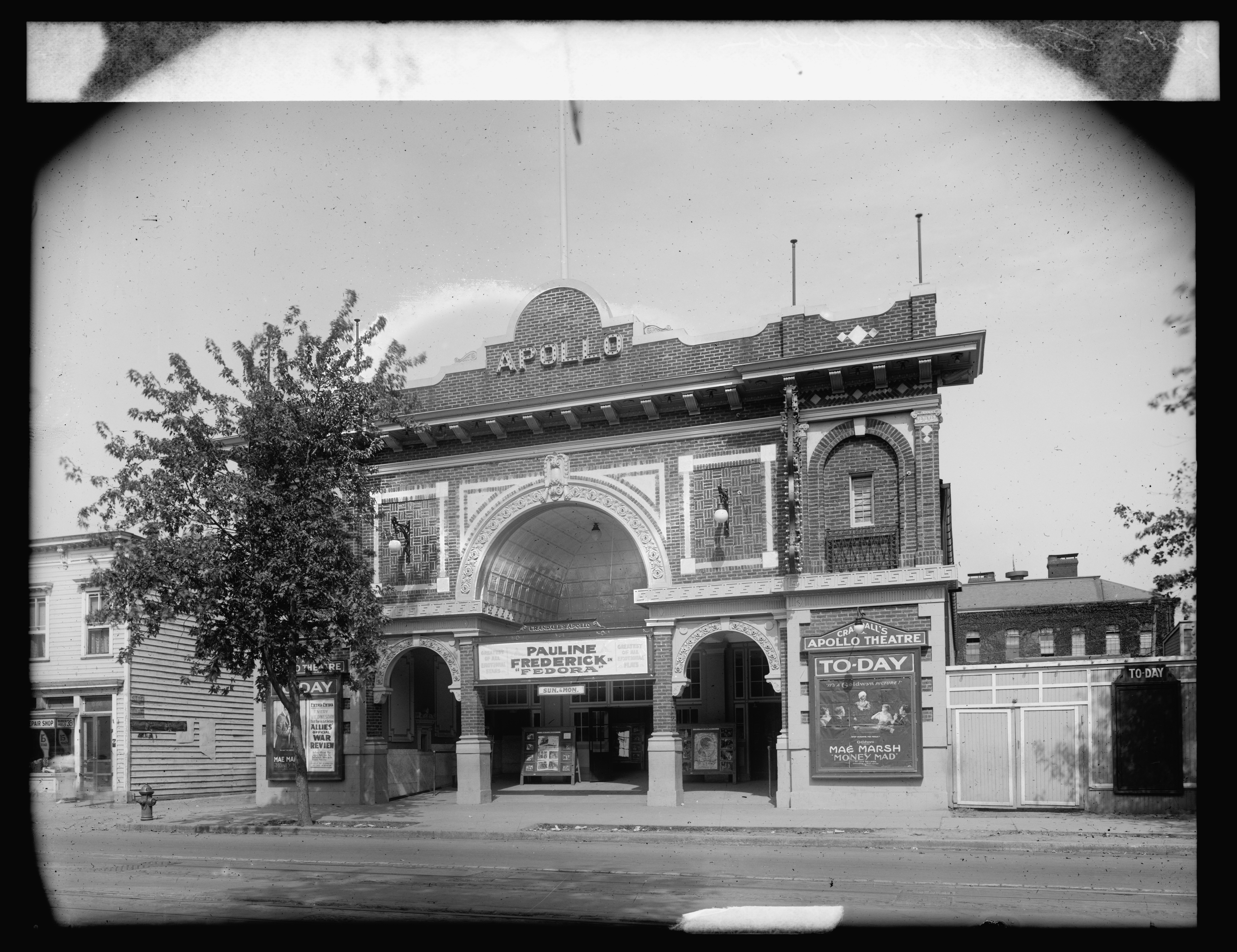
The Apollo Theater in 1918 playing Fedora with Pauline Frederick playing Princess Fedora and Money Mad (1918) with Mae Marsh in the role of Elsie Dean

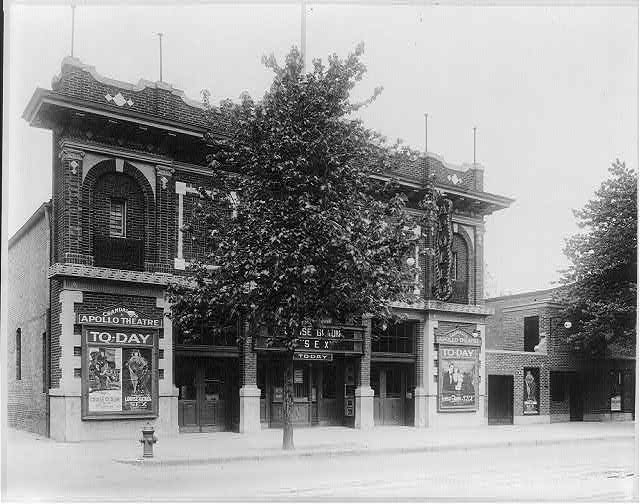
The Apollo Theater in 1920 playing Sex with Louise Glaum as Adrienne Renault

The parcel of land in the middle of the 600 block of H Street NE was 150 feet deep and 225 feet wide. It was originally owned by the Kidder Lodge of the Independent Order of Odd Fellows and leased to the Apollo Amusement Company. On April 2, 1913, a building permit is issued to the Apollo Amusement Company to build a theater on the land at 624 H Street NE. The architect is A. Clark Jones and the builder W. B. Avery. The Apollo open-air picture garden and the Theater were built on this lot.

In 1922, the Apollo Theater underwent a major remodel (including a balcony) which increased the seating capacity. In early October of that same year, Harry Crandall purchased the parcel of land from Kidder Lodge for $65,000. He had already purchased all the stocks of the Apollo from the Apollo Amusement Company two years earlier. The buildings along with the improvements were valued at $200,000 at the time.

Harry Crandall already owned several movie theaters at the time and his investments were closely watched by the newspapers at the time. This deal was seen as a major investment in the neighborhood at the time and was seen as an encouragement to invest on H Street.

On June 29, 1930, Warner Bros. Theaters of Washington announced a plan to demolish the old Apollo Theater to replace it with a bigger movie theater. This theater would be able to accommodate 2,500 with a balcony and air conditioning. It would be a bigger structure and therefore the land adjacent to the theater was purchased. The major reason for this new structure was that the Apollo could only play silent movies. The new theater would be able to play "3 Dimensional Films" on a wide screen. The old theater would be demolished as soon as the final plans would be drawn up by the New-york firm Rapp & Rapp. It is not believed this plan ever materialized.

=== Decline ===
On December 29, 1949, Stanley Company of America (formally Stanley-Crandall Company of America) sold the land and buildings at 624 H Street NE to Ourisman Chevrolet, Inc. Ourisman Chevrolet had been a neighbor since the early 1920s across the street at 625 H Street NE. On May 31, 1925, they had purchased the land adjacent to the theater (610-616 H Street). In June 1926, they had moved their sales to across the street at 610 H Street NE. The purchase of the Apollo Theater was to allow further growth.

The theater was demolished in 1955. It was replaced by a five-story service center used by Ourisman. The location became a Buick dealership taken over by Bob White in September 1966. The dealership moved from 624 H Street NE to 2461 Wisconsin Avenue NW later that year while the service center remained at that location.

The land goes through several ownerships from the 1960s to the 1990s. On August 1, 1997, the land is sold to the Pilgrim Baptist Church. On January 15, 1999, the building is leased to the "H Street Self Storage Center".

The land is sold to 650 H Street LLC on June 3, 2014 and the building was demolished soon after. In 2017, a new residential building with a Whole Foods Market on the ground floor opened. This building was named the "Apollo” as an homage to the long-gone theater which used to be there.

== Movies and other events ==
The Apollo Theater played silent movies such as "The Honeymoon" (1917), Rebecca of Sunnybrook Farm (1917) with Mary Pickford, The Mystery Girl (1918), Cheating Cheaters (1919) and Sex (1920). These were advertised in the newspapers of the period. Many of these movies are now lost.

Rebecca of Sunnybrook Farm (1917)

Sex (1920)

Several other events also took place at the venue. For example, on October 21, 1922, the young patrons could meet Ezra Meeker, the famous American pioneer who traveled the Oregon Trail. Fund-raisers were also held there such as the one held on June 19, 1920 to support the Casualty Hospital.
