= Reginald Geare =

American architect

Reginald Wycliffe Geare (1889 – August 20, 1927) was an American architect known for his design of theaters. His career was ended by the Knickerbocker Theatre disaster (January 28, 1922), when a record snowfall collapsed the theater's flat roof, killing 98.

Geare was closely associated with Harry M. Crandall and with early Washington theater design. Geare's theaters include the Apollo Theatre in Martinsburg, West Virginia (1914), the Knickerbocker Theatre in Washington, D.C. (1917), the Metropolitan (1918), the York (1919), the Strand in Cumberland, Maryland (1920), and the Lincoln Theatre in Washington, D.C. (1922). He also designed the theater portion of the Southern Aid Society-Dunbar Theater Building.

Geare was also the original architect selected for Washington’s Tivoli Theatre in Washington, D.C., but following the Knickerbocker disaster he was replaced by Thomas W. Lamb. Lamb was also commissioned to rebuild the Knickerbocker, afterward known as the Ambassador. The coroner's jury found that the theater victims had died because of faulty construction and design. A grand jury indicted Geare and four others for manslaughter, though none was convicted. Geare died by suicide on August 20, 1927.

Ten years after Geare's suicide, Harry Crandall, the owner of the Knickerbocker, also committed suicide.

Of his theaters, only the Apollo, Lincoln, and York survive—the Apollo and Lincoln receiving historic landmark status in 1979 and 1993 respectively.
