= Tivoli Theatre (Washington, D.C.) =

- Tivoli Theater
- U.S. National Register of Historic Places
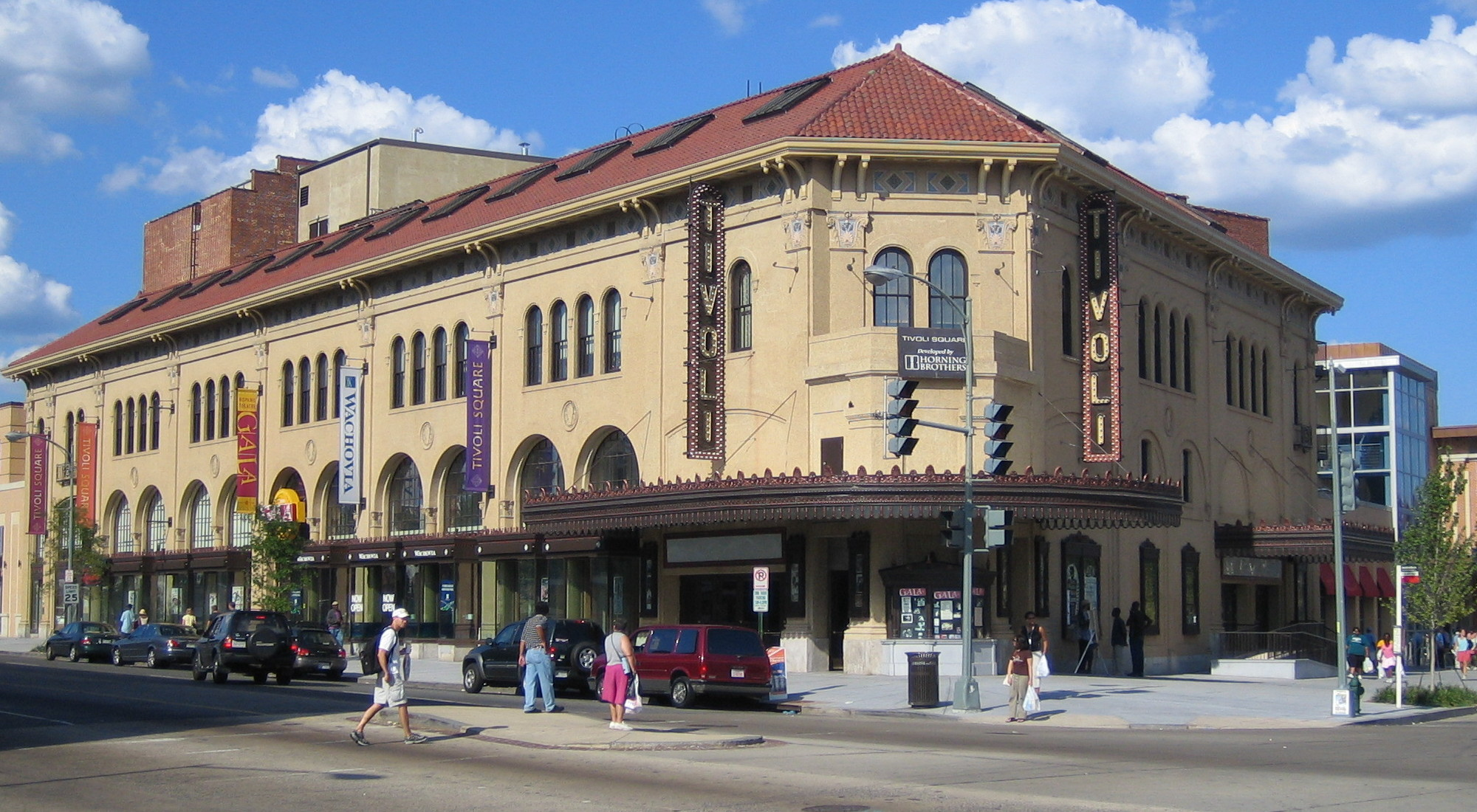
- Tivoli Theatre in 2005

- Location within Washington, D.C.
- Location: 3301-3325 14th St. NW; Washington, D.C.
- Coordinates: 38°55′50.9″N 77°1′56.6″W
- Architect: Thomas W. Lamb
- Architectural style: Italian Renaissance revival, Mediterranean Revival
- NRHP reference No.: 85000716
- Added to NRHP: April 10, 1985

The Tivoli Theatre is a landmark building in the Columbia Heights neighborhood of Washington, D.C., on 14th Street and Park Road Northwest. Originally built as a movie theater, it now exhibits live stage productions as the home of the GALA Hispanic Theatre.

== History ==
The Tivoli Theatre was designed by prominent New York architect Thomas W. Lamb. It reflects Italian Renaissance revival and Mediterranean Revival architectural styles with its stucco exterior, red tile roof, ornate cornices, and numerous graceful arches. Completed in 1924 at a cost of $1 million, the theater was, until its closing in 1976, one of the most elegant movie houses in Washington, D.C. In addition to the main theater auditorium, the building contained offices on the upper floors and several two-story shops along the 14th Street and Park Road frontages. In the quarter century it has lain vacant, the building has suffered from neglect, extensive vandalism, and severe water damage due to a leaking roof.

The history of the Tivoli is closely associated with that of the Knickerbocker Theater, designed by Reginald Geare, and built during the First World War. The owner of the Knickerbocker, theater magnate Harry M. Crandall, operated a chain of movie theaters in Washington. Geare was his primary Washington architect and, in addition to the Knickerbocker, had designed the Metropolitan in 1917 and the Lincoln in 1921. The Knickerbocker was located on the southwest corner of 18th Street and Columbia Road in Adams-Morgan, the present location of a SunTrust Bank.

In a brief 24-hour period spanning January 27–28, 1922, a massive storm dropped 26 inches of snow on the city, causing the fragile roof of the Knickerbocker to collapse. Few of the patrons who had filled the theater that evening for a screening of the comedy hit "Get Rich Quick Wallingford" escaped unharmed. In the heaped rubble of the auditorium, 98 people were found dead and 136 injured. Following the collapse of the Knickerbocker, Crandall released Geare as his primary architect, even though Geare had already begun work on a new theater in the fashionable neighborhood of Columbia Heights.

In his place, Crandall appointed the reputable young Thomas Lamb from New York as architect for all of his subsequent designs, including the Ambassador, built from the remains of the Knickerbocker, and the Tivoli. Lamb began designing the Tivoli less than six months after the Knickerbocker collapse. Incorporating a new understanding of structural integrity which followed in the wake of the disaster, Lamb designed the Tivoli as three separate bodies-stage, auditorium, and perimeter.

The earliest architectural drawings of the Tivoli are labeled Scheme A and date to June 15, 1922, at which point the theater did not have a name but was simply referred to as "Theater Building." Lamb's original proposal features ornate, decorative detail throughout the exterior. There is far more stucco detail surrounding the numerous windows on the second floor of this original conceptual design.

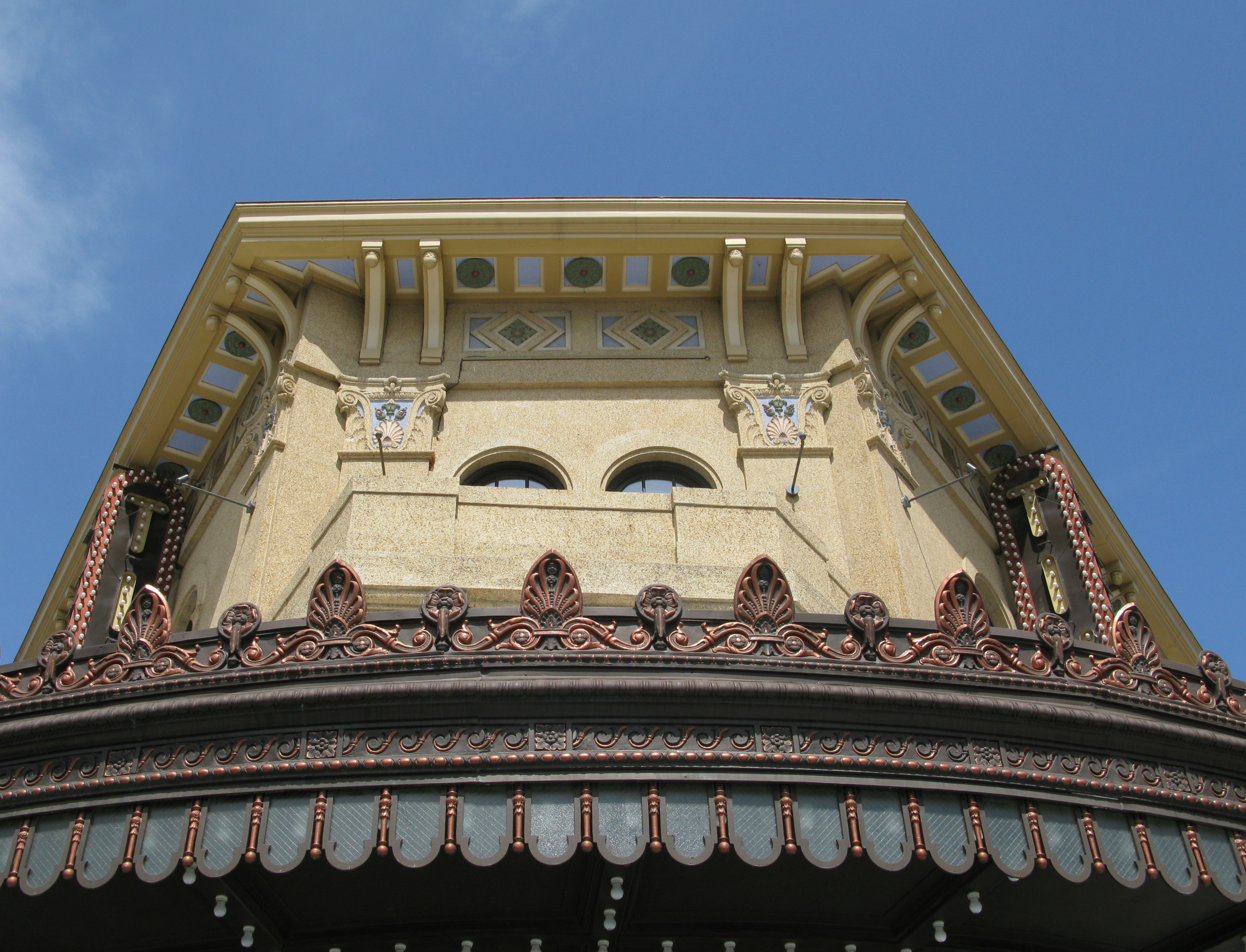
Tivoli Theatre (Detail)

The canopy and marquee from these Scheme A drawings also differ from what was eventually built. The artistic streetscape rendering at the beginning of this series of pages reflects this grand original concept. (These original architectural drawings were found in the archives of the Avery Library of Columbia University, New York City.)

Ornate Scheme A drawings were still being produced as late as December 11, 1922. However, by April 12, 1923, the date of the final architectural drawings, the theater building had been given the name Tivoli and the drawings had become simpler and streamlined, nevertheless still fully reflective of the Italian Renaissance style. The change in design was most likely due to constraints imposed by owner Harry M. Crandall, whose initial building cost estimate was $650,000.

On Monday December 4, 1923, construction commenced on the Tivoli, which became the ninth in the chain of Washington theaters owned by Crandall. Although the final building was less ornate than the original conceptual drawings, it still cost over $1 million when it was completed in 1924.

The cross-section of the exterior reveals the wooden brackets and tin soffits under the eaves of the tile roof, masterful detail easily overlooked given the current condition of the building. One of the grand old palaces of Washington, D.C., the Tivoli was almost saved by a group of local supporters during the 1970s.

== History since 1976 ==
In 1976, the Tivoli was closed due to increased deterioration of the theater and the local area. After over 25 years closure, the Tivoli has benefited from a revitalization of the Columbia Heights neighborhood. In 2005, the Tivoli was reopened after an almost six year renovation. The Tivoli is now the home of GALA (Grupo de Artistas LatinoAmericanos) Hispanic Theatre, a local non-profit committed to sharing Hispanic culture through the arts. GALA currently uses the former balcony and there is mixed retail and restaurant use in the rest of the building, including a Dave's Hot Chicken, where they preserved parts of the original decor.

== See also ==
- GALA Hispanic Theatre
- Columbia Heights (Washington, D.C.)
- Howard Theatre
- Lincoln Theatre (Washington, D.C.)
- Theatre in Washington, D.C.
- 826DC/Tivoli's Astounding Magic Supply Co.
