= GALA Hispanic Theatre =

Theater in Washington, DC

Grupo de LatinoAmericanos Hispanic Theatre
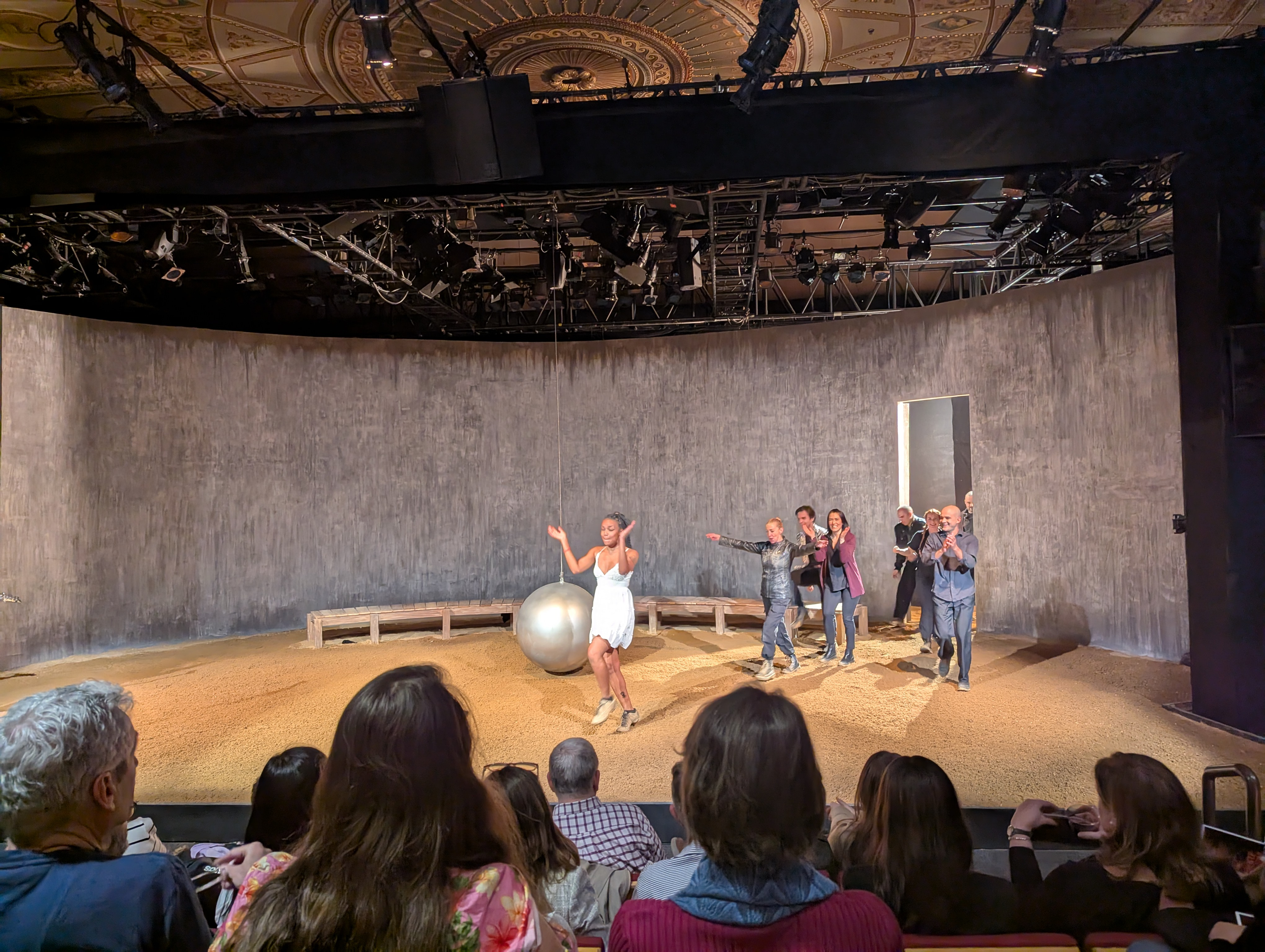
- "Fuenteovejuna" performance at GALA Hispanic Theatre in 2025
- Address: 3333 14th St NW; Washington D.C.

GALA (Grupo de Artistas LatinoAmericanos) Hispanic Theatre is a theater located at 3333 14th St NW in Washington, D.C. It hosts plays in Spanish and English, as well as dance, music, poetry, spoken word, art and films.

== History ==
The GALA Hispanic Theatre was founded in 1976 by Hugo and Rebecca Read Medrano and their supporters with the aim of preserving and promoting Hispanic language and culture. There are many theaters in Washington, D.C., but there was not one for Hispanics until the opening of GALA. Their playwrights and their actors are of Hispanic heritage, hailing from countries including Argentina, Mexico, Spain, Chile, Uruguay, Paraguay, and Peru.

In the infancy of GALA's life as a theatrical company they operated out of a brick and mortar townhouse in Washington, D.C.. In 1976, the same year GALA was founded, the Tivoli Theatre (Washington, D.C.) was closed after protests and civil unrest caused the neighborhood it resided in to collapse. The theatre remained standing following this civil unrest, however the neighborhood was slow to recover. Nine years later, in 1985, the theater was placed on the National Register of Historic Places, but sat empty for almost twenty-five years until the district accepted a proposal by developers to renovate the theater in 1999. It was transformed into a full-scale live performance theater with office and retail space. Many theatrical companies applied for the theater space, but it was ultimately granted to the GALA Hispanic Theatre. In 2005, after four years of close deliberation on the architectural makeup with developers, the Tivoli Theatre opened its doors to theatrical arts once again and became a permanent national Hispanic theatre.

== Themes of productions ==
From the beginning of the GALA Hispanic Theatre's formation they sought out artists from a myriad of artistic disciplines such as visual artists, writers, dancers, singers, musicians and actors who felt the desire to provide a community in which Hispanic culture could thrive and develop. Due to this influence the plays that are performed by this company offer social commentary at every turn and touch on topics affecting the economic and political status of Latinx people.

== Gender equality ==
In 2015, Gala was awarded the 50/50 Applause Award by The International Center for Women Playwrights, for having more than 50% of its plays written by female playwrights.

== See also ==
- Tivoli Theatre (Washington, D.C.)
- Columbia Heights (Washington, D.C.)
- Howard Theatre
- Lincoln Theatre (Washington, D.C.)
- Teatro de La Luna
- Theatre in Washington, D.C.
