= Harry Crandall =

American businessman

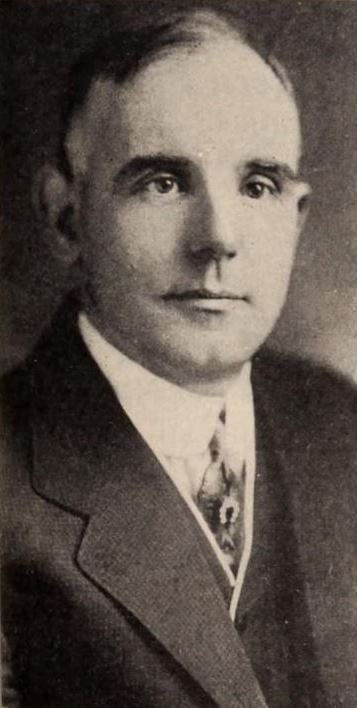
- Crandall in a 1920 magazine
- Born: November 1879
- Died: 25 February 1937 (aged 57)

Harry Milton Crandall (1879–1937) was an American businessman who owned a chain of 18 theaters in Washington D.C., Maryland, Virginia, and West Virginia. Among the theaters he owned was the Savoy, in Washington, D.C., his fourth acquisition.

At the height of his career, Crandall owned eighteen theaters in Washington D.C., Maryland, Virginia, and West Virginia. His theaters were well regarded in their communities, and many of them featured elegant and opulent designs which were formerly reserved for opera houses. His chain included first-rate movie houses such as the Apollo Theater (WV) theatre in Martinsburg, West Virginia, the Metropolitan, the Apollo Theater (DC), the Tivoli Theatre, the Savoy, The Stanley Theatre Baltimore, and the Knickerbocker Theatre in Washington, D.C.

Crandall opened the Casino Theater at Fourth and East Capitol streets in 1907, though he soon sold it. In 1910, Crandall opened the La Grand Open Air Park, and in 1913 the Joy Theater at 437-439 9th Street. Crandall later identified this period as when he started to take the motion picture business seriously. While operating the Joy Theater, he began to dream of a larger theater downtown and a large theater in each section of the city. To fulfill his vision, he initially purchased and refurbished existing neighborhood movie houses that were generally modest in size such as the Apollo Theater on H Street NE.

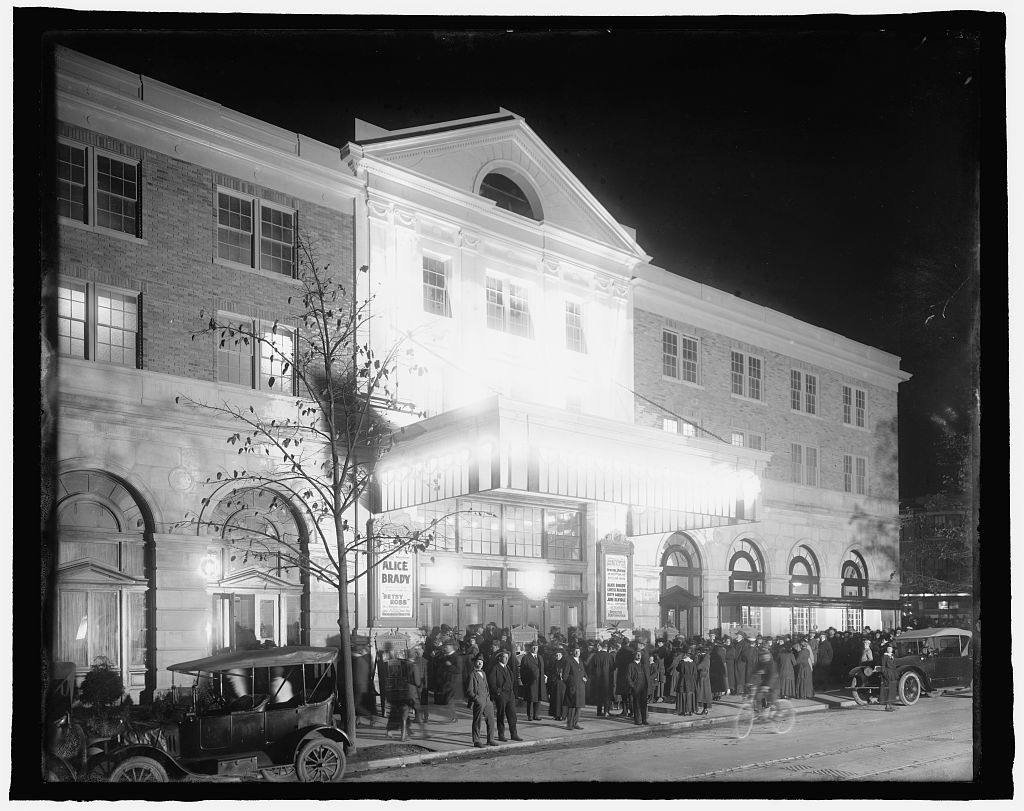
The Knickerbocker Theatre 1917

However, Crandall began commissioning entirely new buildings designed by Reginald W. Geare, such as the Knickerbocker (1917), the Metropolitan (1918), the York (1919), and the Lincoln (1922). The Metropolitan was located in Washington's central business core on F Street, a short distance from the Joy Theater. The Knickerbocker, York, and Lincoln, on the other hand, were built outside the business district. Of these four theaters, only the York and Lincoln remain.

In 1925, Crandall sold 75 percent of his theater interests to the Stanley Company of Philadelphia, forming the new Stanley-Crandall Company. Crandall retained 25 percent ownership and became the executive of the company, which, at the time, was among the four largest theatrical organizations in the country. The Stanley-Crandall Company was purchased in 1927, by Warner Brothers. Harry Crandall retired from active theater operation in 1929.

Crandall used his position and his theaters to educate the population, and to provide space for their cultural and civic activities. He created a Public Service and Educational Department and placed it under the direction of Harriet Hawley Locher, a prominent Washington club woman and past chairperson of the Motion Picture Committee of the District of Columbia Federated Women's Clubs. Crandall and Locher believed that the neighborhood theater could function as a community center, and that it could provide space for educational, cultural and religious activities when not showing movies. In another move to gain the good will of neighborhood children, Crandall provided equipment for boys’ baseball teams.

On January 28, 1922, the Knickerbocker theater owned by Crandall collapsed under the weight of snow from a two-day blizzard that was later dubbed the Knickerbocker Storm. 98 patrons were killed and 133 more injured. The disaster ranks as one of the worst in Washington. D.C. history. Former Congressman Andrew Jackson Barchfeld and a number of prominent political and business leaders were among those killed in the theater. The disaster was said to be the reason for the later suicide of Crandall in 1937. The theater's architect Reginald Geare had died by suicide on August 20, 1927.
