= Apollo Theatre (Martinsburg, West Virginia) =

- U.S. National Register of Historic Places
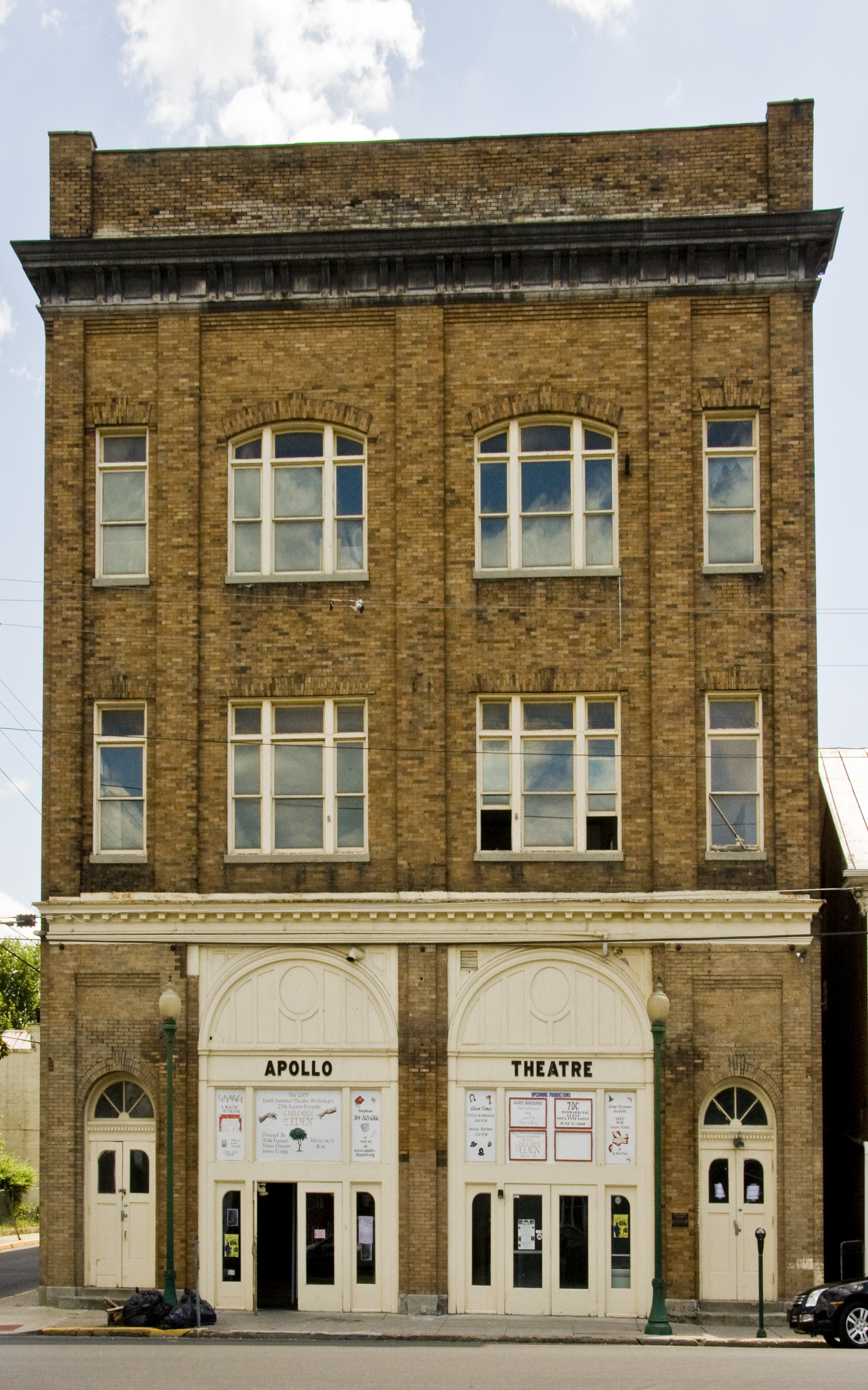

- Location within West Virginia Location within the United States
- Location: Martinsburg, West Virginia
- Coordinates: 39°27′30.42″N 77°57′43.56″W
- Built: 1912
- Architect: Reginald Geare, Chapman E. Kent
- NRHP reference No.: 79002569
- Added to NRHP: October 11, 1979

The Apollo Theatre in Martinsburg, West Virginia, US was designed by architect Reginald Geare with local architect Chapman E. Kent, and erected in 1913 by theater owner H. P. Thorn. As constructed it had a seating capacity of 1000, and was used for movies, vaudeville and concerts. Upper floors provided meeting spaces for large groups.

The Apollo Theatre is operated as a community-supported facility. It was listed on the National Register of Historic Places in 1979. It is included in the Downtown Martinsburg Historic District.

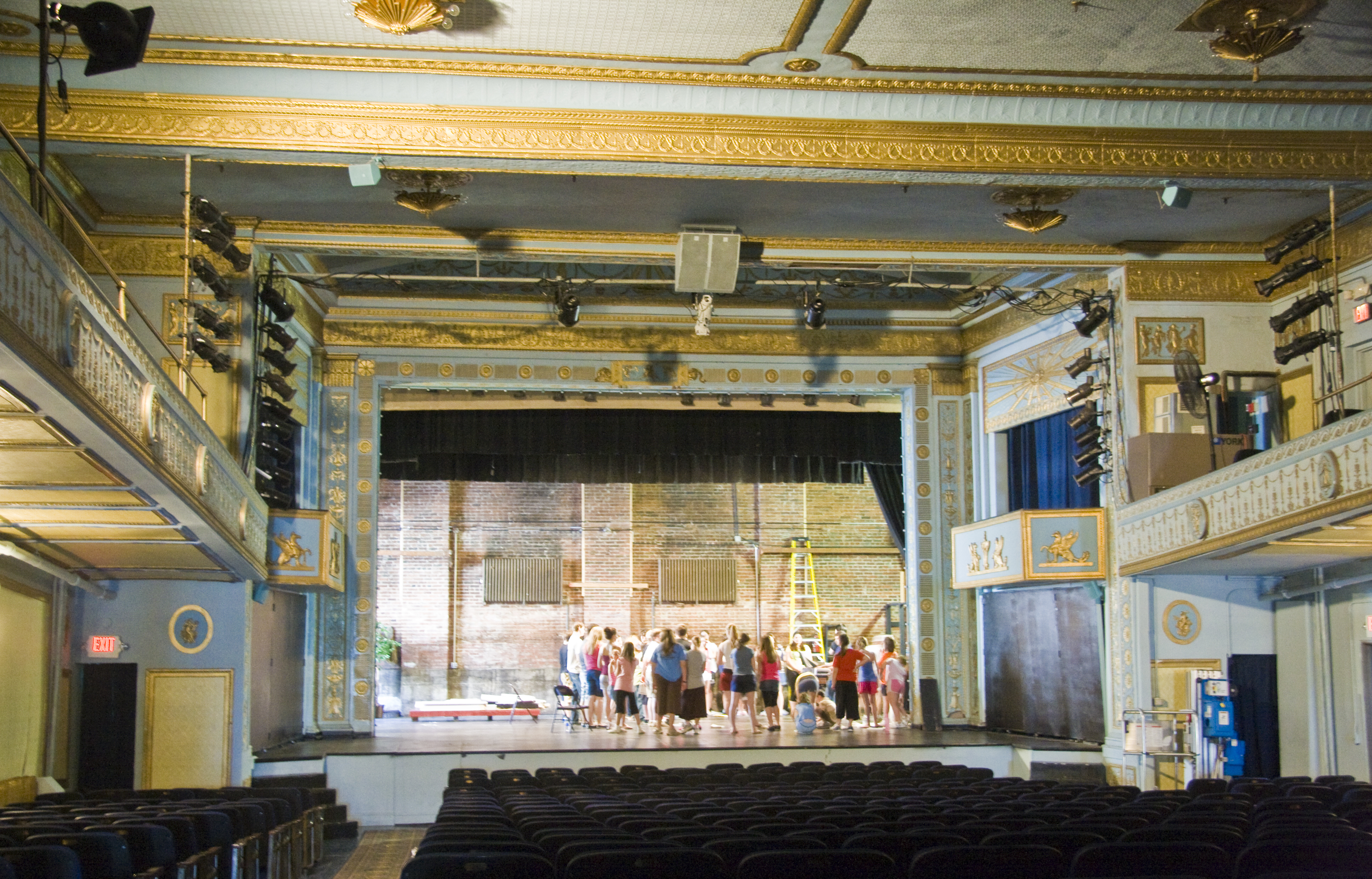
Interior of the Apollo Theatre
