= Knickerbocker Theatre (Washington, D.C.) =

Former movie theater in Washington, D.C.

The Knickerbocker Theatre
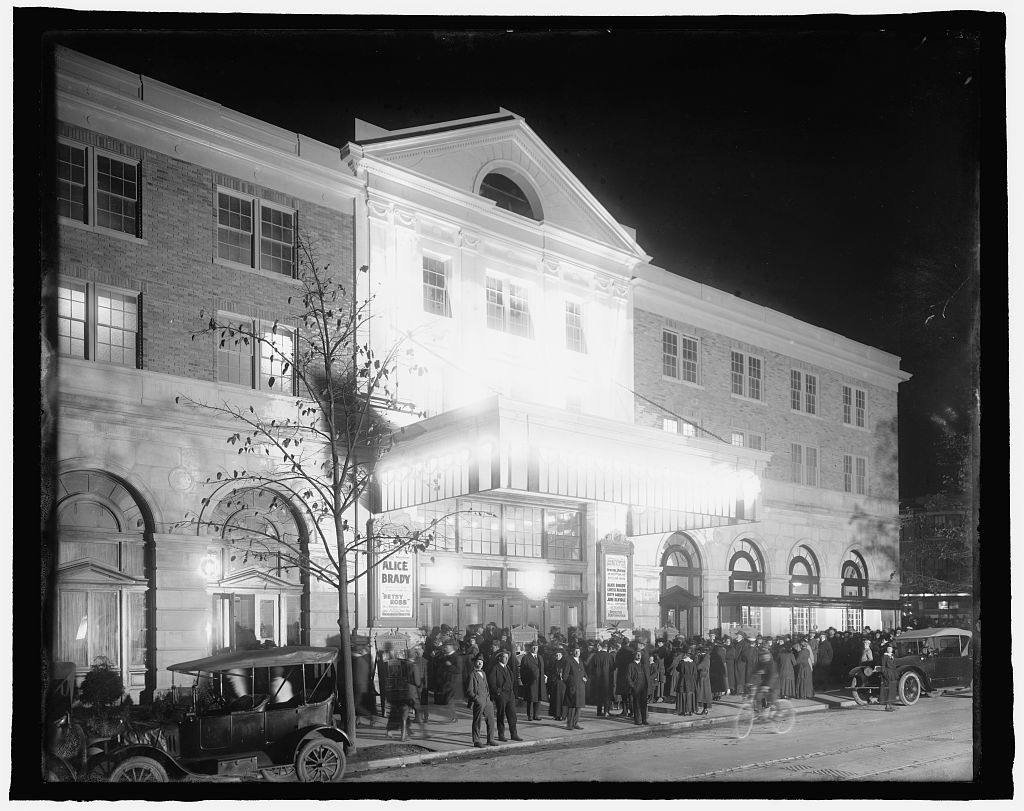
- The Knickerbocker Theatre in October 1917

- Location within Washington, D.C.

General information
- Status: Destroyed
- Type: Film theater
- Location: 18th Street and Columbia Road, Washington, D.C., U.S.
- Coordinates: 38°55′20″N 77°02′34″W
- Completed: 1917
- Destroyed: 1922

Design and construction
- Architect: Reginald Geare

The Knickerbocker Theatre was a movie theater located at 18th Street and Columbia Road in the Adams Morgan neighborhood of Washington, D.C. in the United States. The theater's roof collapsed on January 28, 1922, under the weight of snow from a two-day blizzard that was later dubbed the Knickerbocker storm. The theater was showing Get-Rich-Quick Wallingford at the time of the collapse, which killed 98 patrons and injured 133.

The disaster was the worst in Washington, D.C., history. Former Congressman Andrew Jackson Barchfeld and several prominent political and business leaders were among those killed in the collapse. The theater's architect, Reginald Geare, and owner, Harry Crandall, later died by suicide in 1927 and 1937, respectively.

The Knickerbocker Theatre collapse is tied with the Surfside condominium collapse in 2021 as the third-deadliest structural engineering failure in United States history, behind the Hyatt Regency walkway collapse in 1981 and the collapse of the Pemberton Mill in 1860.

== Theater ==
The Knickerbocker Theatre was commissioned by Harry Crandall in 1917. Designed by architect Reginald Geare, it had a seating capacity of 1,700. In addition to serving as a movie theater, it served as a concert and lecture hall, with ballrooms, luxurious parlors and lounges.

== Collapse ==
On January 28, 1922, the Knickerbocker was showing the silent comedy Get-Rich-Quick Wallingford. News reports estimated that between 300 and 1,000 people were in the theater that evening. Two days before, a severe blizzard had begun and lasted twenty-eight hours, resulting in a significant accumulation of snow and ice throughout the Washington area. It was the worst snowfall the capital had seen since 1899, and much of the city was paralyzed. The snow accumulation on the Knickerbocker's flat roof put significant strain on the structure, and on the evening of January 28, it gave way.

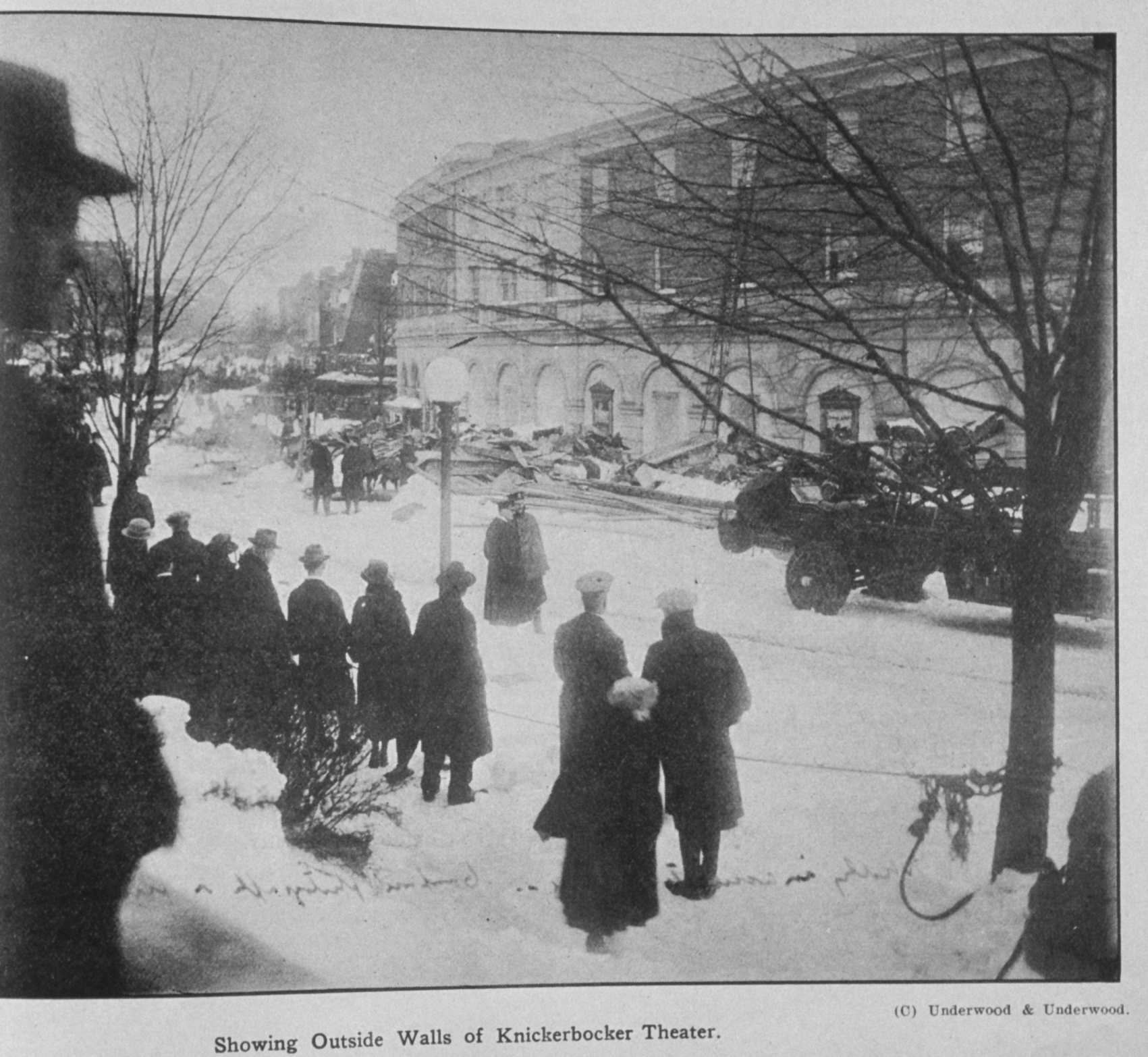
The Knickerbocker Theatre from the outside after the collapse of the roof

The collapse occurred suddenly just after 9:00 p.m. Witnesses reported that they had no hint of danger, such as creaking or loud noises, beforehand. With a loud noise, the theater roof collapsed onto the concrete balcony, and both, in turn, collapsed onto the orchestra seating section. In the moments after the collapse, a witness called a telephone operator, who spread the alarm to police, firefighters, and hospitals. She also phoned the city government, which ordered the immediate closure of all theaters in the city to prevent loss of life from any further collapses.

People near the Knickerbocker during the collapse rushed to help, although their efforts were disorganized until more than 600 soldiers and Marines arrived. Army Major George S. Patton was called upon to lead the rescue effort. It took time for authorities to establish control over the scene as relatives of the victims tried to gain entry. Authorities also experienced delays in getting fire engines and other equipment to the theater, as the streets of the city remained nearly impassable in places due to snow and vehicles that had become stuck during the blizzard. However, a fleet of ambulances from Walter Reed Army Medical Center and volunteer taxis reached the scene and evacuated some of the injured to hospitals.

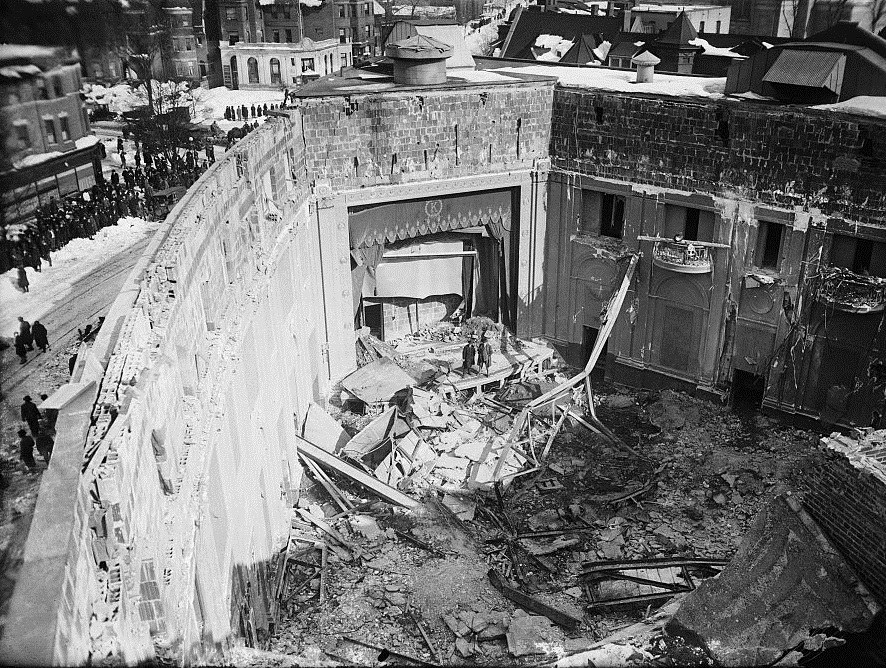
Interior of the theater after the collapse

Even with large numbers of police, firefighters, and military personnel, by 2:30 p.m. the next day, the rescuers had still been unable to remove debris from the balcony and reach those seated in the orchestra. While they worked, a young boy crawled through the rubble. He delivered water to the victims to keep them alive. Neighboring houses and stores were used temporarily for medical treatment. A nearby Christian Science church was used as a morgue.

As a result of the collapse, 98 people died and 133 were injured. Nearby residents, including the theater's architect, Reginald Geare, helped pull bodies from the debris, feed the rescuers, and supply them with hot drinks. Geare's knowledge of the building's design was invaluable in the rescue work. Many pulled from the rubble were either dead or barely conscious. Contemporary accounts described severe crushing injuries resulting in loss of limbs or forced amputations to extricate the victims.

Among the fatalities were former Pennsylvania congressman Andrew Jackson Barchfeld, other politicians, members of the diplomatic corps, and business people. Two members of the National Press Club, the Pittsburgh Dispatch's reporter Louis W. Strayer and the Brooklyn Daily Eagle's Chauncey C. Brainerd, were among the victims who perished. Many media reports focused on less famous but more tragic figures, such as a violinist in the theater's orchestra who had been married five days previously and a honeymooning couple who were attending the movie that night. Another report mentioned a young boy brought to the temporary morgue to identify the bodies of both his parents and his two sisters.

== Aftermath ==
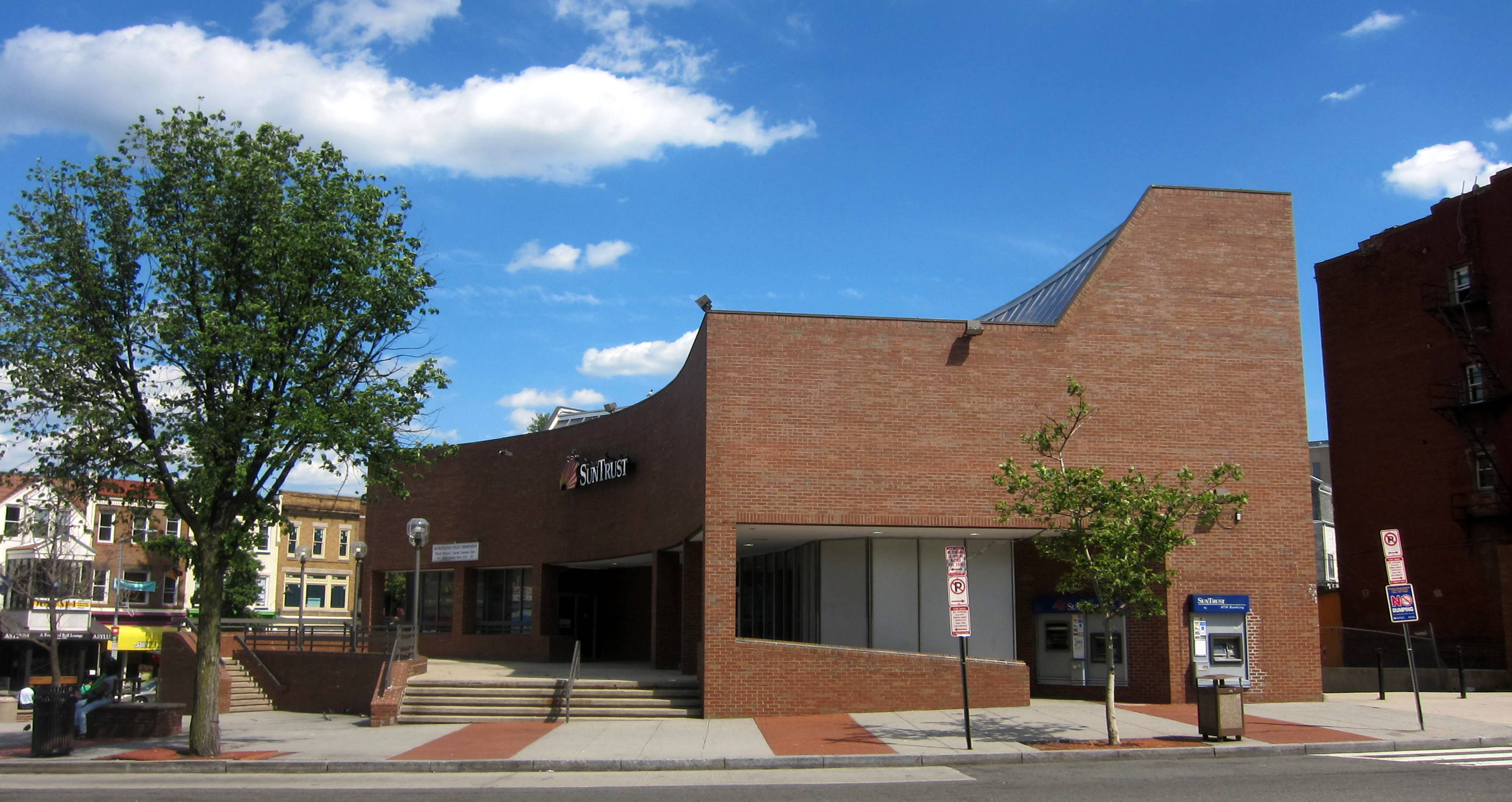
The design of the building on the Knickerbocker's site is meant to evoke its memory.

Many investigations were conducted into the causes of the collapse by the D.C. city government, both houses of Congress, the city coroner, and the courts. Early witness accounts suggested that theater employees had discussed removing the snow from the roof, but had decided that it was unnecessary.

The investigations concluded that the collapse was most likely the result of poor design, blaming the use of arch girders rather than stone pillars to support the roof. A study in Engineering News Record found that, rather than a defect in the beams themselves, the wall bearing the load from one crucial beam had gradually moved out of position, allowing the beam to slip out. However, several lawsuits that resulted from the collapse were unsuccessful, as the courts were unable to determine who was liable.

The year after the collapse, a new theater was built in the same location, dubbed the Ambassador Theater, which in turn was torn down during a 1960s-era urban renewal project. The site is now the location of a former SunTrust bank, built in the shape of a movie theater to pay homage to the Knickerbocker Theatre.

Geare, whose career had been effectively ended by the collapse, died by suicide in 1927. Crandall died by suicide ten years later, leaving a note for reporters asking them not to be too hard on him.

The storm that led to the collapse was later dubbed the Knickerbocker Storm.

== Book ==
In 2013, The Knickerbocker Snowstorm (Images of America), was released.
