= Knickerbocker storm =

1922 blizzard on the United States East Coast

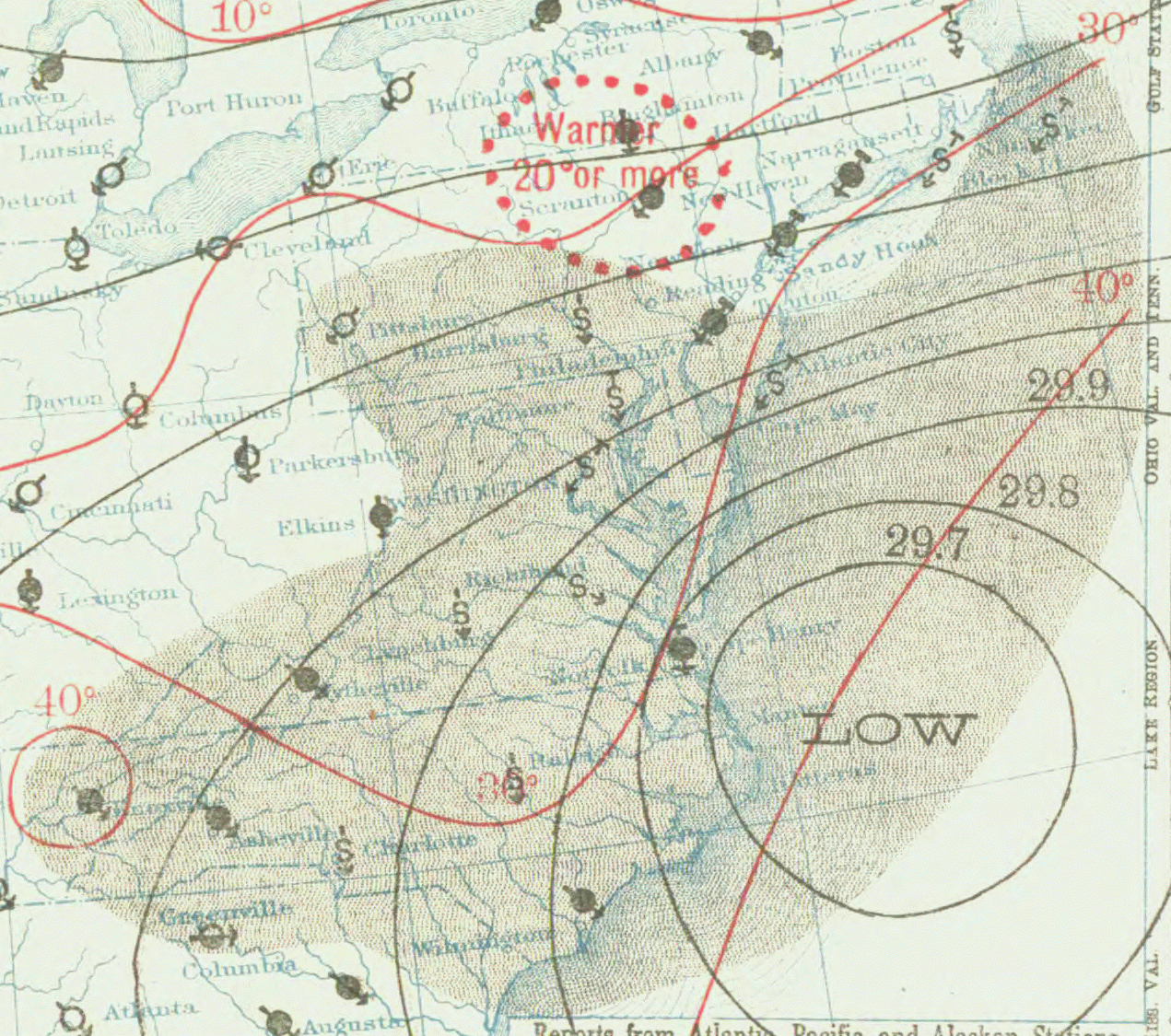
- Weather map for the morning of January 28, 1922

Meteorological history
- Formed: January 27, 1922
- Dissipated: January 29, 1922

Category 5 "Extreme" blizzard
- Regional snowfall index: 18.53 (NOAA)

Overall effects
- Casualties: 98 fatalities, 133 injured
- Areas affected: Mid-Atlantic states of the United States

The Knickerbocker storm was a blizzard on January 27–28, 1922 in the upper South and the middle Atlantic United States. The storm took its name from the resulting collapse of the Knickerbocker Theatre in Washington, D.C., shortly after 9 p.m. on January 28, which killed 98 people and injured 133.

== Setup for the event ==
An Arctic air mass was in place across the northeast United States; Washington, D.C. had been below freezing since the afternoon of January 23. The front that spawned the cyclone was almost completely dry until after it crossed the Gulf of Mexico, making this storm unique among large southeast snowstorms. Despite the slow start, a low formed and deepened rapidly off the Georgia coast as the cold front reached the Gulf Stream on January 27. Heavy snow quickly developed from the Carolinas to Pennsylvania as the low drifted north to the Outer Banks of North Carolina on the 28th. Strong high pressure to the north helped to cut the system off from the jet stream. As a result, the cyclone took three days to move up the East Coast of the United States, which was double the normal estimated time used by forecasters of that era for storm systems that move up the coast. Snow reached Philadelphia and Washington, D.C. by noon on January 28, and continued into the morning of January 29. Temperatures remained in the 20s Fahrenheit (-5 °C) through much of the event.

== Impact ==
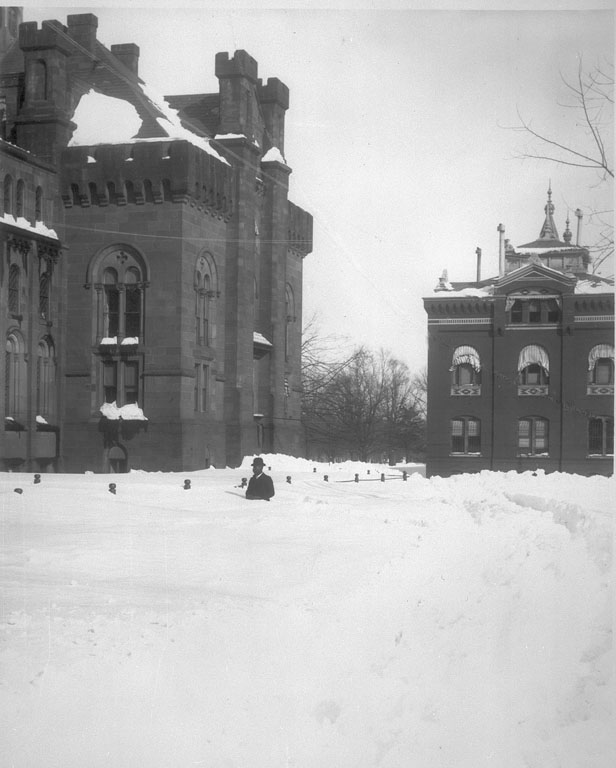
Deep snow drifts near the Smithsonian Institution in Washington, D.C.

An estimated 22,400 square miles (58,000 km2) of the northeast United States were affected by 20 inches (51 cm) of snow from this cyclone, which was over one-fifth of the total area that received over 4 in (10 cm) of snow. Snowfall was quite heavy in Maryland and Virginia. Richmond, Virginia recorded 19 inches (48 cm). Baltimore was paralyzed as it received the most snowfall within 24 hours since 1872. Parts of North Carolina also received over one foot of snow.

=== Impact in Washington, D.C. ===
The measured snow depth at the main observing site in Washington, D.C. reached 28 in (71 cm) while an observer in Rock Creek Park a few miles to the north measured 33 in (84 cm) with 3.02 in (76.7 mm) of liquid equivalent. Railroad lines between Philadelphia and Washington were covered by at least 36 in (91 cm) of snow, with drifts as high as 16 ft (4.9 m). This snowstorm is the biggest in the history of Washington since official record keeping began in 1885 (although it is dwarfed by the 36 inches (91 cm) of snow in the Washington–Jefferson Storm of January 1772). Among other disruptions, Congress adjourned as a result of the storm.

== Theater roof collapse ==
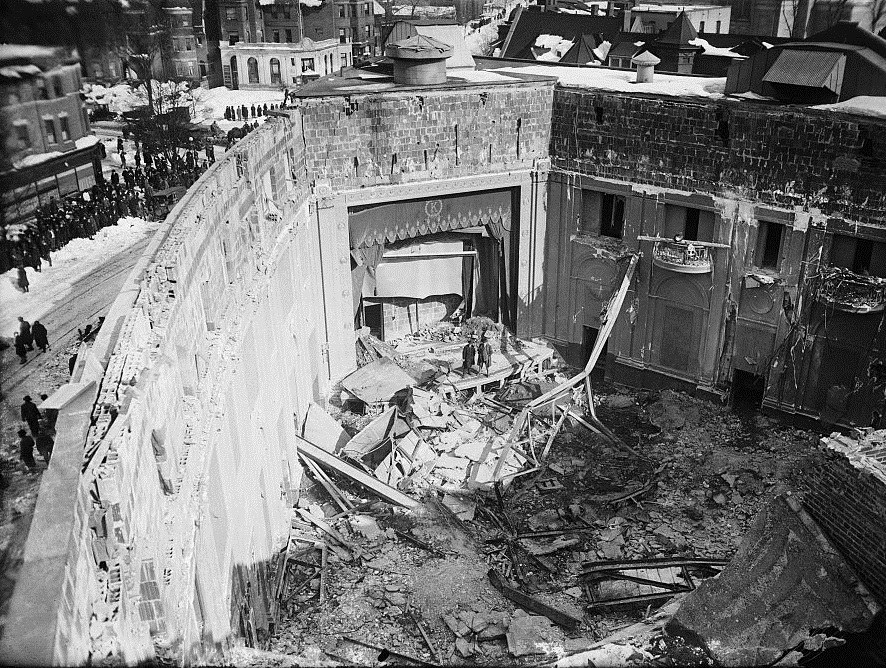
Interior of the Knickerbocker Theatre after the collapse of the roof as a result of the weight of snow from the storm.

The Knickerbocker Theatre was the largest movie house in Washington, D.C., built in 1917 and owned by Harry M. Crandall. The roof was flat, which allowed the snow to collect on it. The theatre was showing the movie Get-Rich-Quick Wallingford. During the movie's intermission, the heavy, wet snow split the roof down the middle, bringing down the balcony as well as a portion of the weakened brick wall. Army Major George S. Patton was called upon to lead the rescue effort. A total of 98 people died and 133 were injured.

The disaster ranks as one of the worst in Washington, D.C. history. Former U.S. Representative Andrew Jackson Barchfeld was among those killed. The theater's architect, Reginald Wyckliffe Geare, and owner, Harry M. Crandall, later killed themselves.

== See also ==
- Nor'easter
- January 25-27, 2011 North American blizzard
