= Lincoln Theatre (Washington, D.C.) =

Historic movie theater in Washington, D.C.

Coordinates: 38°55′1″N 77°1′46″W

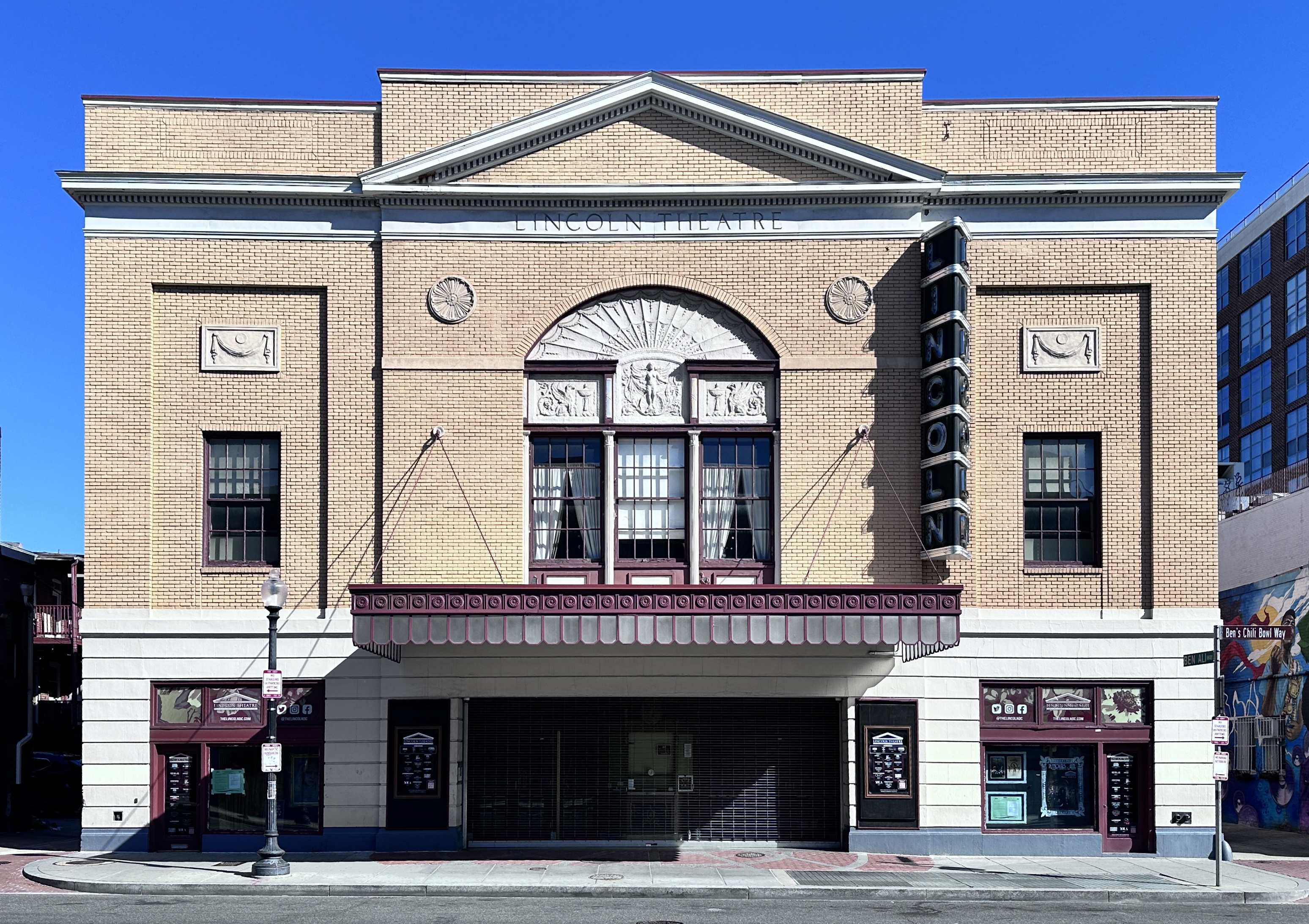
- Lincoln Theatre in 2025
- Interactive map of Lincoln Theatre
- Address: 1215 U Street, NW; Washington, D.C. 20009-4442
- Location: Shaw
- Owner: DC Commission on the Arts and Humanities
- Operator: I.M.P.
- Capacity: 1,225
- Public transit: U Street station

Construction
- Opened: January 22, 1922
- Renovated: 1989–1993
- Architect: Reginald W. Geare

Website
- Venue Website
- Lincoln Theatre
- U.S. National Register of Historic Places
- U.S. Historic district – Contributing property
- Architectural style: Classical Revival
- Part of: Greater U Street Historic District (ID93001129)
- NRHP reference No.: 93001129
- Added to NRHP: October 27, 1993

Lincoln Theatre is a historic theater in Washington, D.C., located at 1215 U Street, next to Ben's Chili Bowl. The theater, located on "Washington's Black Broadway", served the city's African American community when segregation kept them out of other venues. The Lincoln Theatre included a movie house and ballroom, and hosted jazz and big band performers such as Duke Ellington. The theater closed after the 1968 race-related riots. It was restored and reopened in 1994, and hosts a variety of performances and events. The U Street Metro station, which opened in 1991, is located across the street from the Lincoln Theatre.

== History ==
Construction of the Lincoln Theatre began in the summer of 1921, and it opened in 1922. The Lincoln Theatre, which showed silent film and vaudeville, served the city's black community. The theatre was designed by Reginald Geare, in collaboration with Harry Crandall, a local theater operator.

In 1927, the Lincoln Theatre was sold to A.E. Lichtman, who decided to turn it into a luxurious movie house, and added a ballroom. The theatre was wired for sound in 1928. The ballroom, known as Lincoln Colonnade, and the theater were known as the center of "Washington's Black Broadway". Performers at the Lincoln Theatre have included Duke Ellington, Pearl Bailey, Louis Armstrong, Lionel Hampton, Ella Fitzgerald, Cab Calloway, Billie Holiday, and Sarah Vaughan. A television projection system was installed at Lincoln Theatre in 1952. The movie house televised boxing fights on many occasions, such as the Sugar Ray Robinson-Joey Maxim bout on June 25, 1952.

The Lincoln Theatre struggled financially after desegregation opened other movie theaters to blacks beginning in 1953. In the late 1950s, the Colonnade was demolished. The theater fell into disrepair after the 1968 Washington, D.C. riots. In 1978, the Lincoln Theatre was divided into two theaters, and was known as the Lincoln "Twins". In the late 1970s and early 1980s, the Lincoln Theatre featured "All-Night Movie" shows on the weekend, attracting hundreds each weekend. The Lincoln Theatre was sold to developer Jeffrey Cohen in 1983, who closed it for renovations. The theater remained boarded up for many years.

== Restoration ==
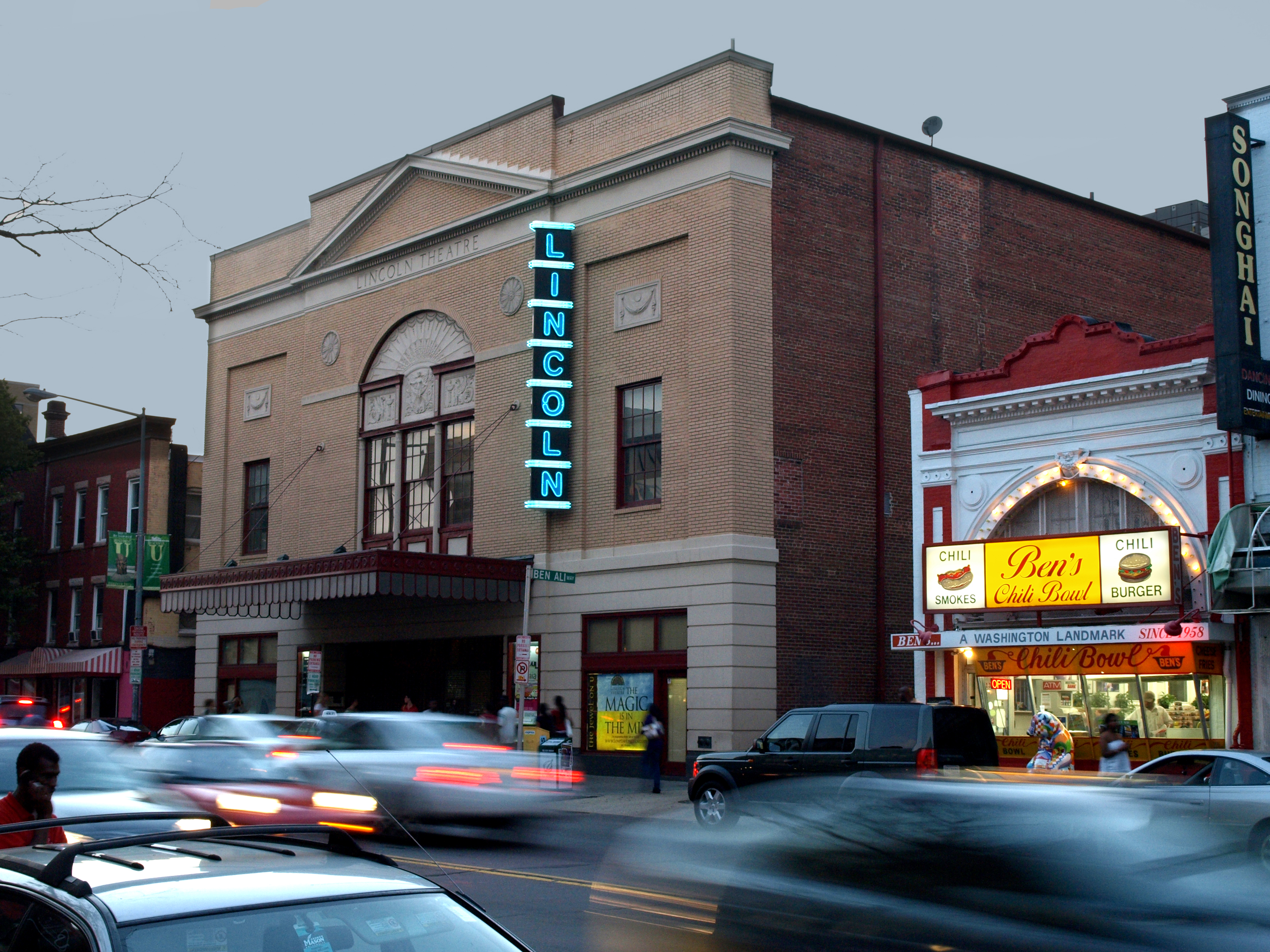
The theatre is located on the U Street Corridor

The Lincoln Theatre was listed on the National Register of Historic Places in 1993. That year, the theatre was restored by the U Street Theatre Foundation, with $9 million of aid from the District of Columbia government. The restoration started in 1989 by developer Jeffrey N. Cohen, who was working on a controversial $250 million redevelopment plan, "Jackson Plaza", for the Shaw/U-Street area. In 1990, Cohen ran into financial difficulties and filed for bankruptcy in 1991. Restoration of the theater was taken over by the District government and the foundation. The restoration work was done by the design firm, Leo A. Daly. The building has a brick exterior, and the interior features Victorian trim.

A "sneak preview" of the renovated theater was held on September 16, 1993, for D.C. Councilmember Frank Smith, Mayor Sharon Pratt Kelly, and 1,000 attendees. The theatre officially reopened on February 4, 1994, with a performance of Barry Scott's Ain't Got Long to Stay Here, which was about the life of Martin Luther King Jr. In March 1995, Lincoln Theatre hosted a play, Where Eagles Fly, written by local playwright Carole Mumin. The play told the story of a local elderly woman who fought the Shaw Urban Redevelopment Project that targeted the Shaw neighborhood for demolition, and sought to preserve the neighborhood and its history.

The 1,250-seat theater has hosted theatrical and musical shows including a 2002 multi-week run of The Jackie Wilson Story from Chicago's Black Ensemble Theatre, and leased space to community groups and for events, and hosted political events such as the mayor's State of the District address. Jazz performances in recent years have included Cassandra Wilson, Quincy Jones, Chuck Brown, and Wynton Marsalis. In 2005, the annual Duke Ellington Jazz Festival was inaugurated and hosted performances. Others that have performed at the Lincoln Theatre include Damien Rice, singer Brian Stokes Mitchell, and comedians Dave Chappelle and Dick Gregory. Lincoln Theatre has also been a venue for Filmfest DC. The theater was the primary venue for the annual LGBT film festival Reel Affirmations from 1998 to 2008. From 2008 to 2010, Arena Stage mounted several productions at the theater, including Carrie Fisher's Wishful Drinking, while its Southwest Waterfront complex was being renovated.

The theater struggled financially after re-opening, requiring financial aid from the District government. In 2011, the theatre was threatened with closure after the city cut funding. The D.C. Commission on the Arts and Humanities then took over management, and began searching for a new operator.

== Current operations ==
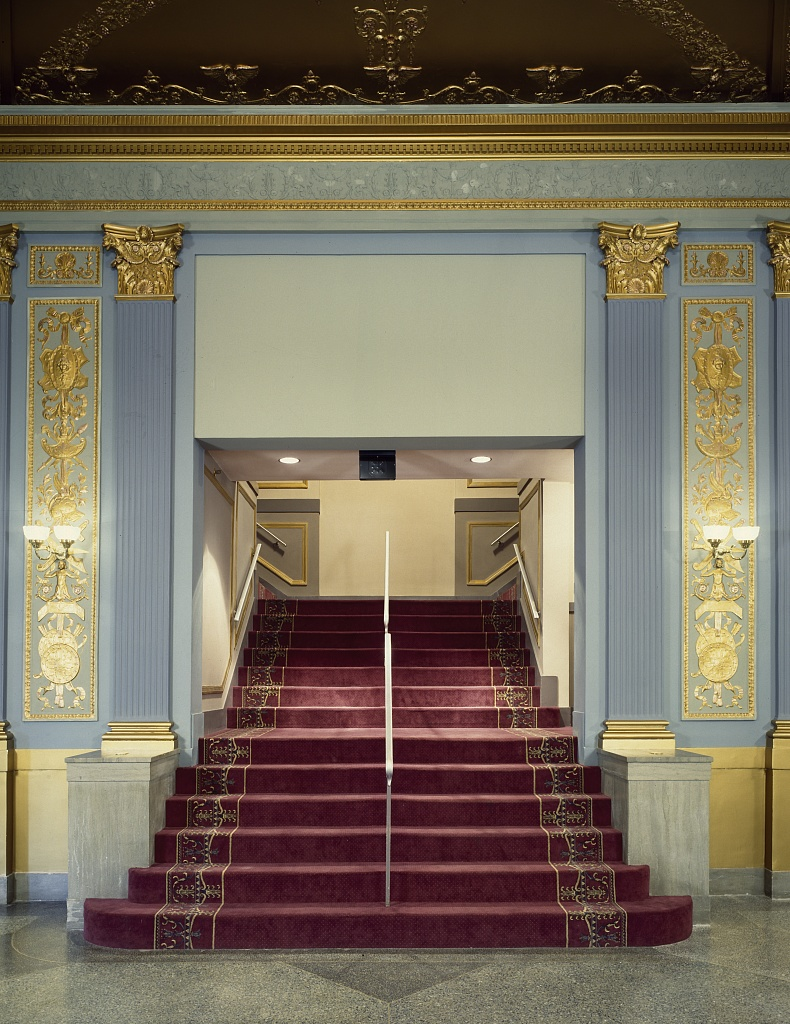
The entry stairway to the Lincoln Theatre

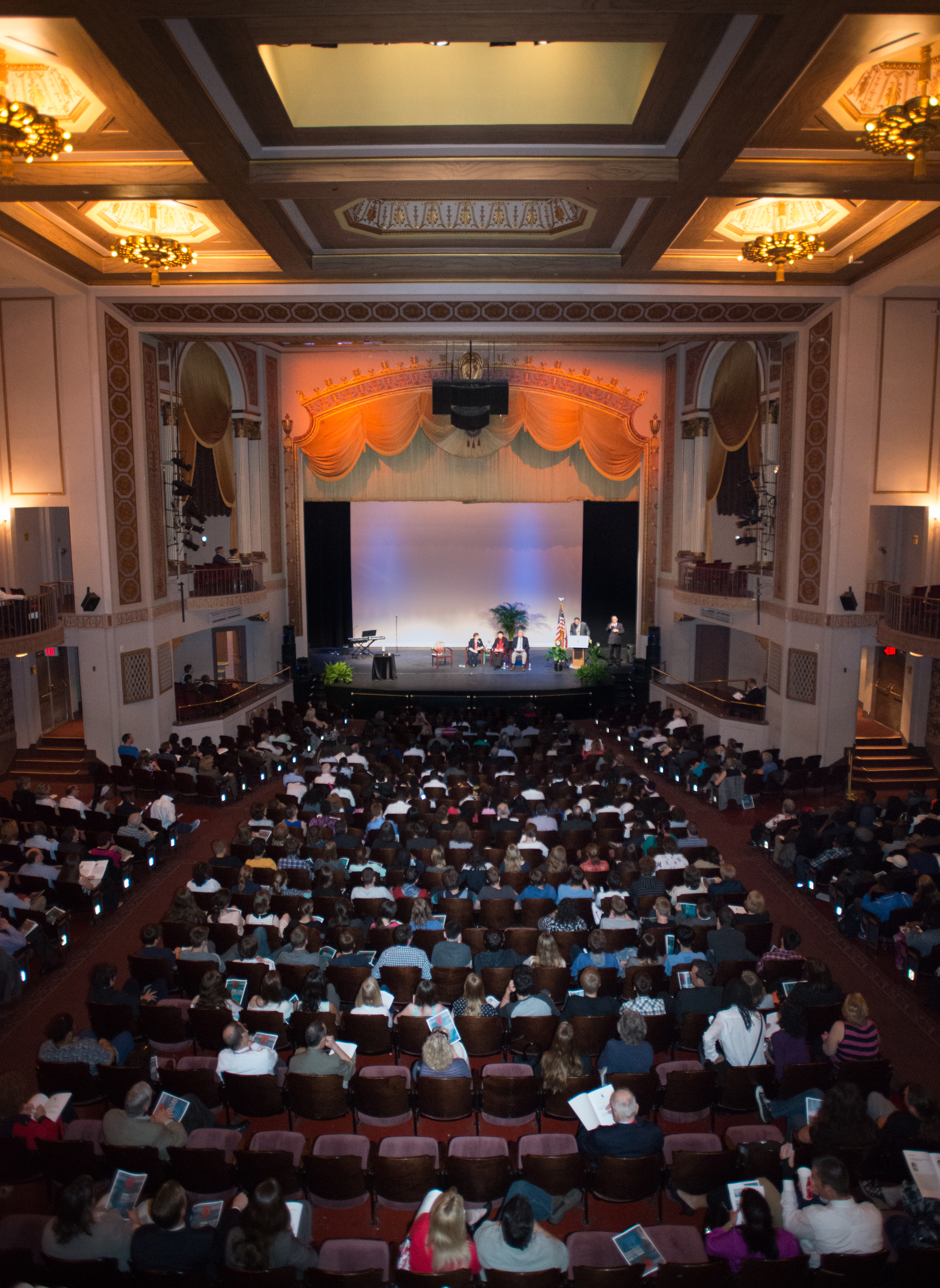
Interior of the Lincoln Theatre

In January 2012, the D.C. Commission on the Arts and Humanities began searching for a new entertainment booking group to operate Lincoln Theatre. The process included evaluating business plans from various groups. In April 2013, I.M.P., the company that owns the 9:30 Club and operates Merriweather Post Pavilion, was selected over other competitors to operate the theatre. In June 2013, DC Mayor Vincent Gray, the Deputy Mayor for Planning and Economic Development, the DC Commission on the Arts and Humanities, and the Deputy of General Services made the official announcement of the selection.

Prior to obtaining sole operation of the theatre, I.M.P. had booked a few shows at Lincoln Theatre, including sold-out performances by Jeff Tweedy in 2010 and Jeff Mangum in 2012. I.M.P. began sole operation of the theatre in the fall of 2013.

Since gaining sole operation, I.M.P. has booked hundreds of shows at Lincoln Theatre, including:

- Janelle Monáe on October 14, 2013
- Chris Cornell on November 23, 2013
- Lauryn Hill on February 9, 2014
- Sharon Jones and the Dap-Kings on February 10 and 11, 2014
- Experience Hendrix ft. Bootsy Collins, Eric Johnson, Dweezil Zappa, Billy Cox, Buddy Guy and more on March 30, 2014
- Peter Frampton on July 8, 2014
- Spoon on September 2, 3, and 4, 2014
- Nas - 20th Anniversary of Illmatic on October 4, 2014
- Hannibal Buress on October 17, 2014
- Chrissie Hynde on November 7, 2014
- Lucinda Williams on November 12, 2014
- Jerry Lewis on January 9, 2015
- The Tragically Hip on January 21, 2015
- Billy Idol on January 25, 2015
- Kendrick Lamar - Kunta Groove Sessions on November 1, 2015
- Louis C.K. on April 8, 2016
- Live at 9:30 Premiere, ft. Henry Rollins on May 2, 2016
- John Carpenter: Live Retrospective on July 12, 2016
- Bryan Ferry on July 23, and 25, 2016
- Preservation Hall Jazz Band with a special appearance by Dave Grohl on September 24, 2016
- Patti Smith in conversation with 9:30 Club Co-Owner Seth Hurwitz on October 12, 2016
- Brian Wilson Performing Pet Sounds 50th Anniversary on May 3, and 4, 2017
- Mystery Science Theater 3000 Live! on July 9, 2017
- Nathan For You Sneak Peek And Q&A on September 10, 2017

== In popular culture ==
Dave Chappelle filmed his 2000 HBO comedy special Dave Chappelle: Killin' Them Softly at The Lincoln Theatre.

Demetri Martin filmed his 2015 Netflix comedy special Live (At The Time) at The Lincoln Theatre on March 7, 2015.

Trevor Noah filmed his 2015 comedy special Lost In Translation at The Lincoln Theatre on July 25, 2015.

Deon Cole filmed his 2016 comedy special Cole Blooded Seminar at The Lincoln Theatre on February 6, 2016.
