= Austin Blair =

13th governor of Michigan (1818–1894)

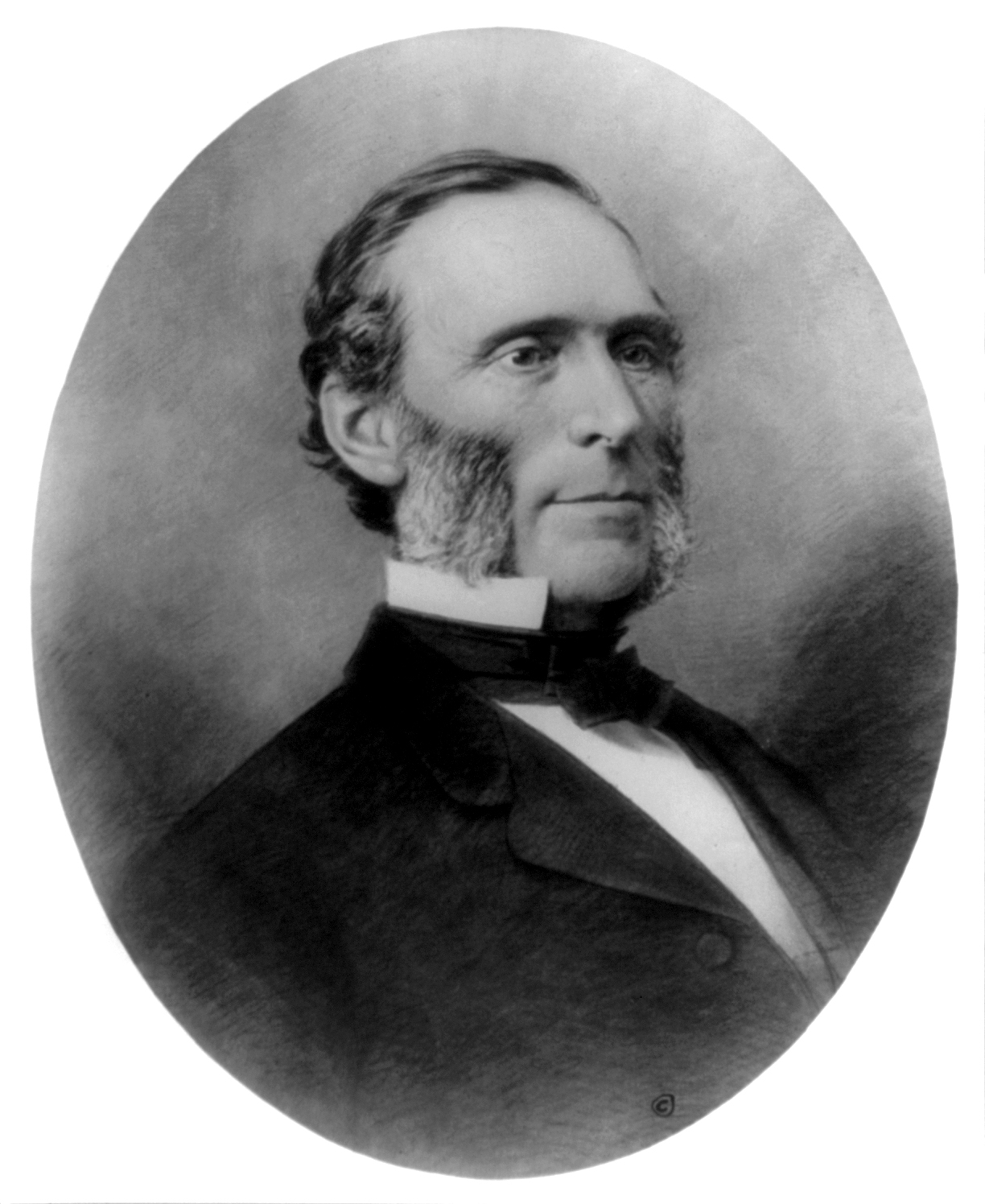

13th Governor of Michigan
- In office January 2, 1861 – January 5, 1865
- Lieutenant: James M. Birney 1861; Joseph R. Williams 1861 (Acting); Henry T. Backus 1861–63; Charles S. May 1863–65
- Preceded by: Moses Wisner
- Succeeded by: Henry H. Crapo

Chairman of the House Republican Conference
- In office March 4, 1871 – March 3, 1873
- Speaker: James G. Blaine
- Preceded by: Robert C. Schenck/ Nathaniel P. Banks
- Succeeded by: Horace Maynard

Member of the U.S. House of Representatives from Michigan's 3rd district
- In office March 4, 1867 – March 3, 1873
- Preceded by: John W. Longyear
- Succeeded by: George Willard

Member of the Michigan Senate from the 12th district
- In office 1855–1856
- Preceded by: Moses Archibald McNaughton
- Succeeded by: Joseph E. Beebe

Member of the Michigan House of Representatives from the Jackson County district
- In office 1846

Personal details
- Born: February 8, 1818 Caroline, New York
- Died: August 6, 1894 (aged 76) Jackson, Michigan
- Resting place: Mt. Evergreen Cemetery in Jackson
- Party: Republican
- Other political affiliations: Whig; Free Soil; Liberal Republican
- Spouse: Sarah L. Ford

Austin Blair (February 8, 1818 – August 6, 1894) was an American lawyer and politician who served as the 13th governor of Michigan during the American Civil War and in Michigan's House of Representatives and Senate as well as the U.S. Senate. He was known as a strong opponent of slavery and secession. He simultaneously sought to ban capital punishment.

== Early life in New York ==
Blair was born in Caroline, New York, in a log cabin built by his father George Blair of Scottish ancestry. It was reportedly the first cabin in Tompkins County, New York and Blair lived there until age 17, helping his father farm the land. He attended the common schools, Cazenovia Seminary and Hamilton College, before transferring to Union College in the middle of his junior year, graduating in 1839. Blair studied law in Owego, New York and was admitted to the bar in Tioga County, New York in 1841. He moved to Michigan in that year, residing first in Jackson before moving to Eaton Rapids.

== Politics in Michigan ==
He began his political career in Eaton Rapids, where he was elected the clerk of Eaton County in 1842. He moved back to Jackson in 1844 and was a Whig member of the Michigan State House of Representatives from Jackson County in 1846. He served on the House Judiciary Committee and was the leading proponent of the successful 1846 effort to abolish capital punishment in Michigan. He left the Whig Party because they did not take a strong anti-slavery stance, and was a delegate to the Free Soil Party National Convention in Buffalo, New York in 1848 which nominated Martin Van Buren.

In February 1849, Blair married Sarah L. Ford, of Seneca County New York. Together they had four sons; George who became a postal clerk in the railway mail service; Charles who became a partner with his father; the other two were Fred and Austin.

He was elected Jackson County prosecutor in 1852 and participated in organizing the Republican Party in 1854. He was chairman of the committee that drafted the Republican platform "under the oaks" in Jackson on July 6. He served in the Michigan Senate, where he represented the 12th district, from 1855 to 1856.

Blair was a delegate from Michigan to the 1860 Republican National Convention, which nominated Abraham Lincoln. He was also elected Governor of Michigan in that year and reelected in 1862, serving from 1861 to 1865.

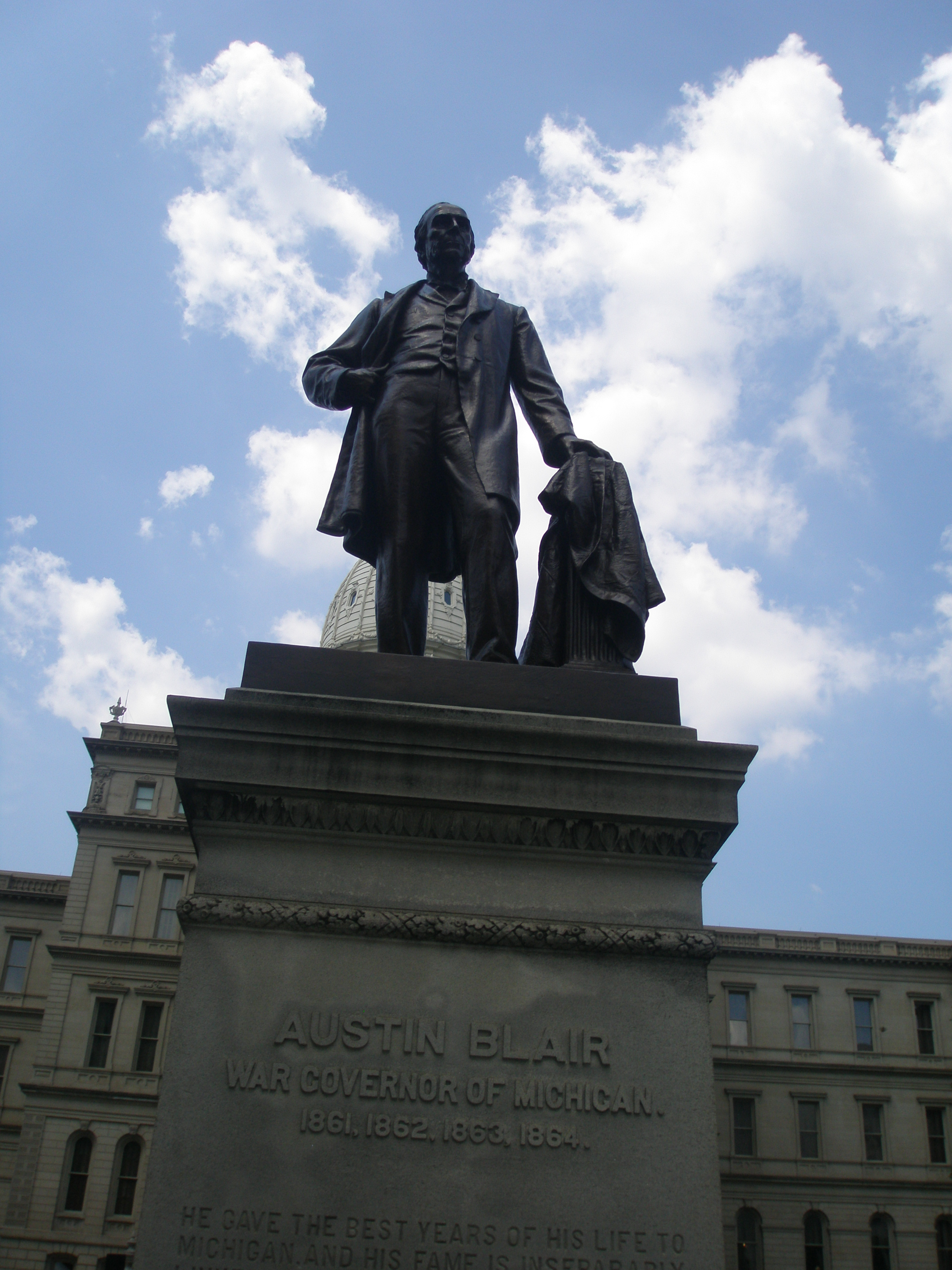
A statue of Austin Blair is located in front of the Michigan State Capitol building.

== Civil War Governor ==
In his first inaugural address in January 1861, Blair recommended that the state offer its entire military resources to Lincoln for maintaining the supremacy of the U.S. Constitution. Within days of the outbreak of the American Civil War in April, Blair responded by calling for ten companies of volunteers. The legislature later retroactively authorized the Governor's quick actions, authorized a war loan of $1,000,000, and passed the Soldiers' Relief Law, requiring counties to provide relief to the families of soldiers. By mid-May, the first regiment of Michigan soldiers, under the command of Colonel O. B. Willcox had left to engage in the field of combat, and was the first western force to arrive at the seat of combat. The second regiment, under the command of Colonel Israel B. Richardson, soon followed.

While the third and fourth regiments were being raised, Blair received directions from the U.S. Secretary of War, limiting the number of regiments that would be accepted from Michigan to four and asked Blair not to raise more than that number. Blair decided to disregard these instructions and continued to establish the fifth, sixth, and seventh regiments, all of which had been deployed by mid-September. Under Blair's guidance, Michigan continued to supply troops for the Union forces throughout the war. One notable unit was a colored unit, known as the 102nd United States Colored Troops, which included two sons of Sojourner Truth and Josiah Henson (the man Harriet Beecher Stowe used as the model for Uncle Tom). In 1862, he attended the Loyal War Governors' Conference in Altoona, Pennsylvania, which ultimately backed Abraham Lincoln's Emancipation Proclamation and the Union war effort.

At the outset of the war, Michigan had a total population of approximately 800,000 and an estimated 110,000 able-bodied men capable of bearing arms. By the end of the war, more than 90,000 Michigan men had volunteered to fight. Blair personally helped to raise about $100,000 to organize and equip the initial muster of troops. When Blair left office in 1864, he was almost destitute, having expended much of his personal wealth in support of the war effort. During this time of conflict, Governor Blair ran the state government from his hometown of Jackson, making that community a hub of Michigan's war effort.

Blair ran unsuccessfully for the U.S. Senate, challenging the politically well-entrenched Zachariah Chandler who, although a fellow Republican, was seen by Blair as representing wealthy, Detroit interests rather than "outstate" interests.

== U.S. Congress, retirement, death, and memorial ==
Blair's grave at Mt. Evergreen Cemetery

Two years after leaving the Governor's seat, Austin Blair was elected to the U.S. House representing Michigan's 3rd congressional district from 1867 to 1873, serving in the 40th, 41st and 42nd Congresses. He was not a candidate for re-election in 1872, but unsuccessfully ran as the Liberal Republican candidate for Governor. He returned to Jackson to resume a private law practice. He was a member of the University of Michigan board of regents from 1881 to 1889. In 1883, Blair was nominated for Justice of the Michigan Supreme Court Republican party, but was defeated.

He died in Jackson and is interred at Mt. Evergreen Cemetery there.

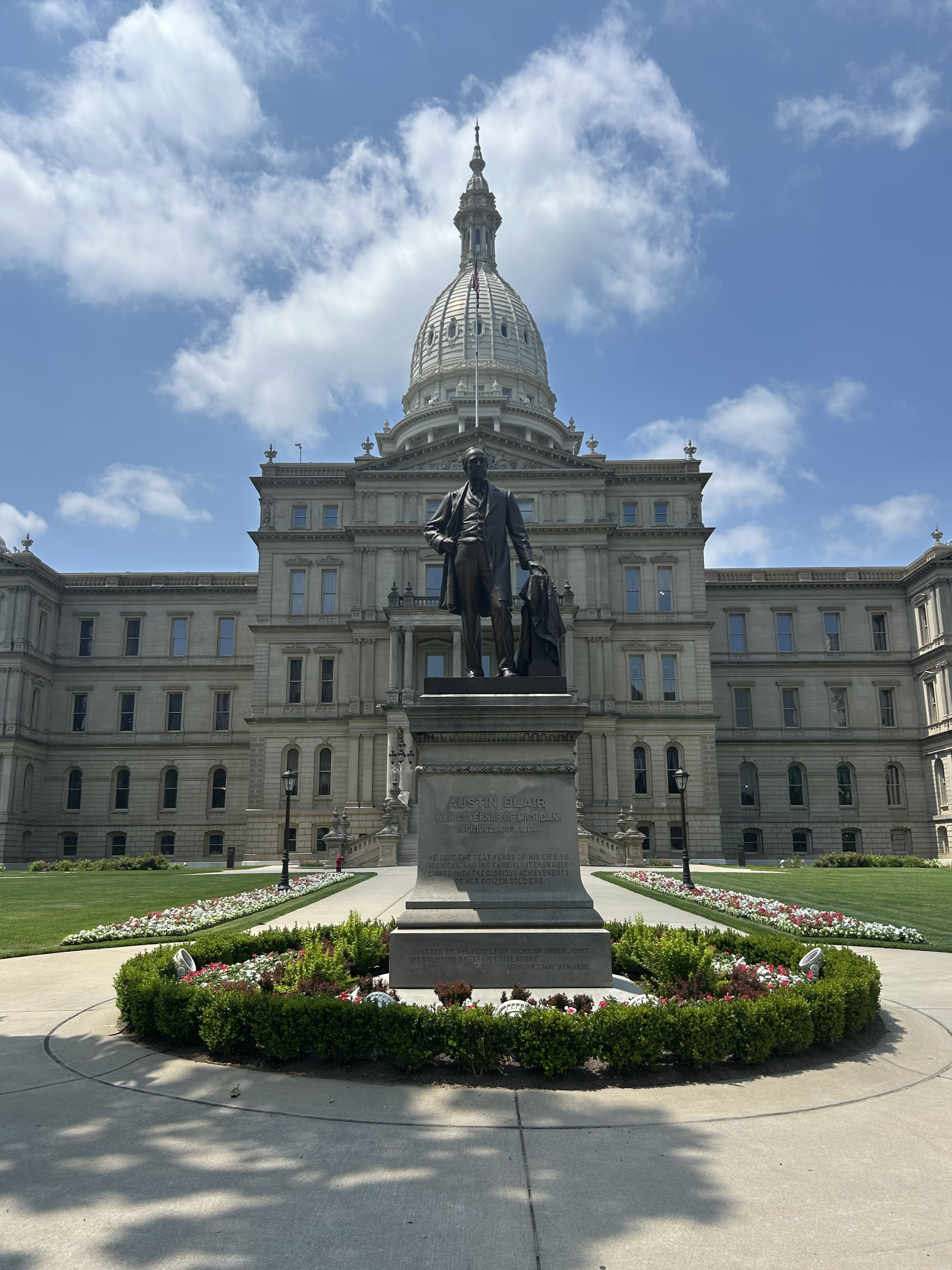
Statue is prominently located in front of the Capitol Building

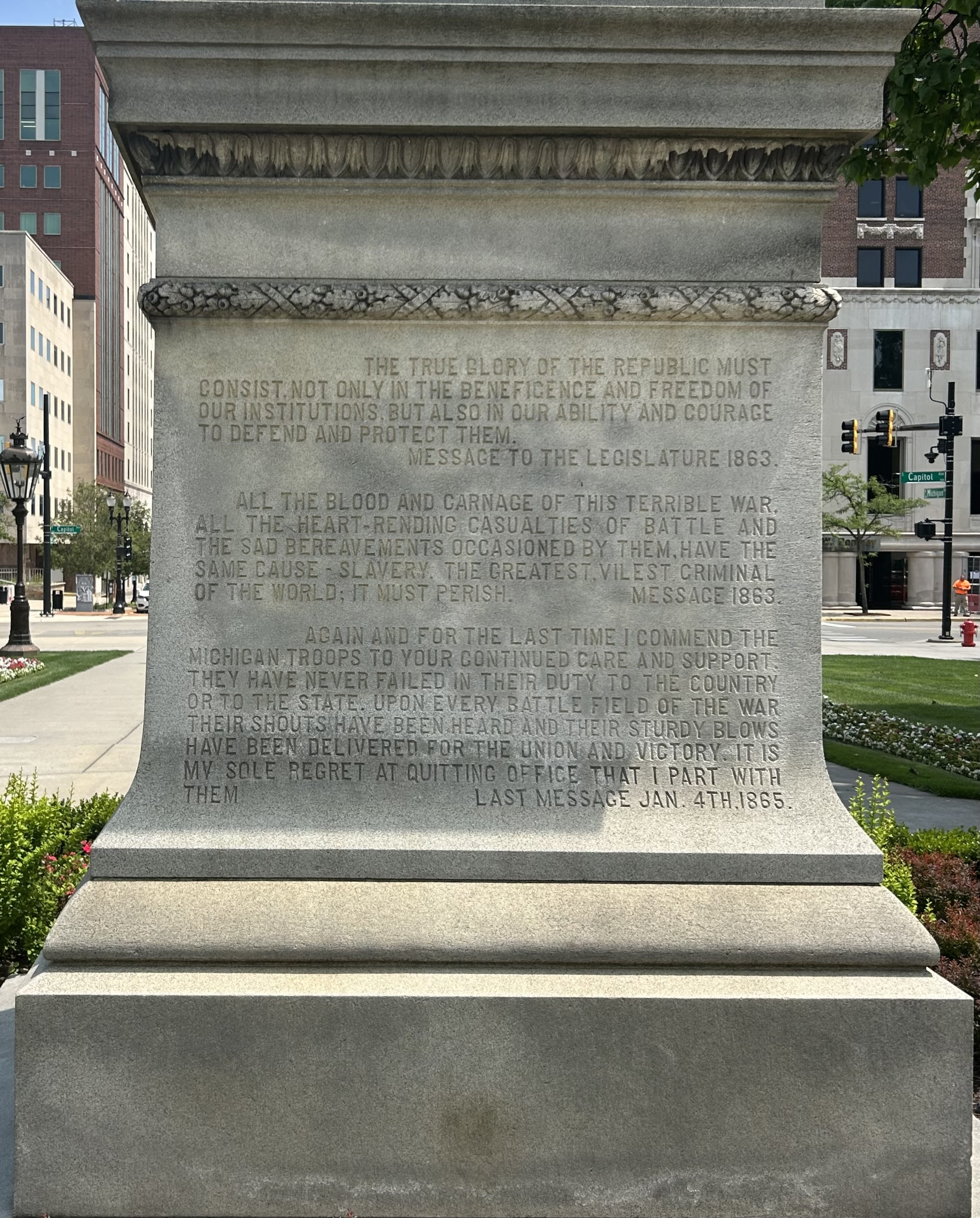
Back inscription

In 1895 the Michigan legislature appropriated $10,000 (~$326,771 in 2024) for a statue in Blair's memory. It was to be placed on Capitol Square, the only time that an actual person has been honored with a statue on the Capitol's grounds. The monument was officially dedicated on October 12, 1898. It is made of bronze and Milford granite and stands just under 25 ft tall. The statue was cast by the Bureau Brothers Foundry in Philadelphia. The granite pedestal was executed by C. W. Hills of Jackson, MI. Edward Clark Potter was the sculptor while Donaldson and Meier designed the pedestal. The monument is unique because of the quote by Blair engraved on the back. It is one of only two monuments to identify slavery as the cause of the Civil War, the other being the Lincoln Memorial in Washington, D.C.

Blair was a Third Class (honorary) Companion of the Military Order of the Loyal Legion of the United States.

Blair Township in Grand Traverse County is named after Austin Blair.

Party political offices
Preceded by Moses Wisner	Republican nominee for Governor of Michigan; 1860, 1862	Succeeded by Henry H. Crapo
Preceded by None	Liberal Republican nominee for Governor of Michigan; 1872	Succeeded by None
Political offices
Preceded by Moses Wisner	Governor of Michigan; 1861–1865	Succeeded by Henry H. Crapo
U.S. House of Representatives
Preceded by John W. Longyear	United States Representative for the 3rd congressional district of Michigan; 1867 – 1873	Succeeded by George Willard
