= Equestrian statue of Charles Devens =

Statue in Worcester, Massachusetts, US

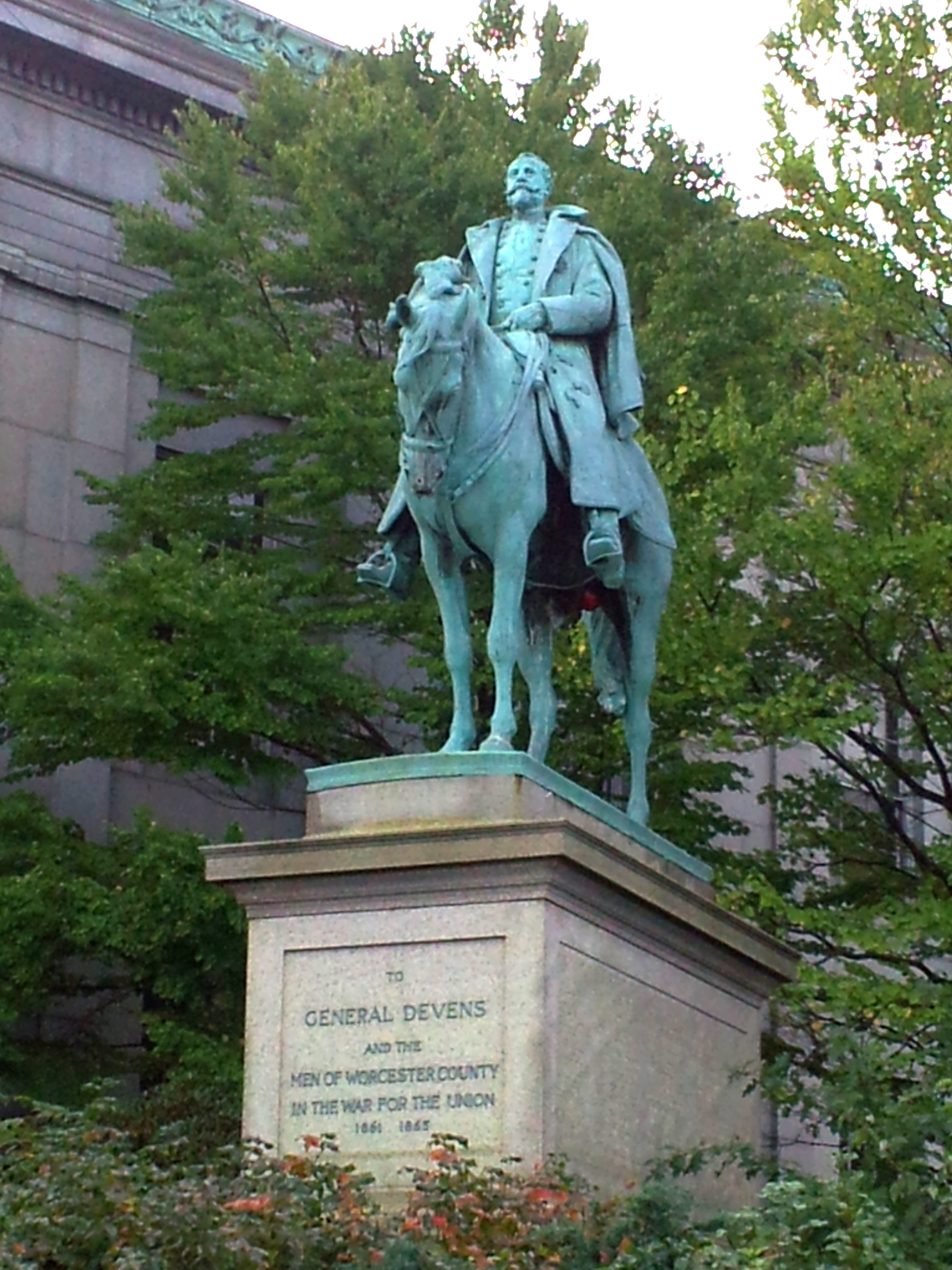
- Charles Devens statue (2011)
- Interactive map of Equestrian statue of Charles Devens
- Location: Institutional District, Worcester, Massachusetts, United States
- Coordinates: 42°16′16″N 71°48′00″W
- Designer: Daniel Chester French; Edward Clark Potter; Robert D. Andrews (pedestal)
- Builder: Gorham Manufacturing Company; George D. Webb Granite and Construction Co. (pedestal); Jno. Williams, Inc. (plaque and lettering)
- Type: Equestrian statue
- Material: Bronze; Granite (pedestal)
- Width: 9.7 feet (3.0 m)
- Height: 40.8 feet (12.4 m)
- Beginning date: 1902
- Completion date: 1906
- Dedicated date: July 4, 1906
- Dedicated to: Charles Devens

The equestrian statue of Charles Devens (also known as the Worcester County Devens Memorial Statue) is a public monument in Worcester, Massachusetts, United States. Located in front of the old Worcester County Courthouse in the Institutional District, the equestrian statue honors Charles Devens, who served as a general in the Union Army during the American Civil War and later served as United States Attorney General. The statue was designed by Daniel Chester French and Edward Clark Potter and was dedicated on July 4, 1906.

== History ==
=== Background ===
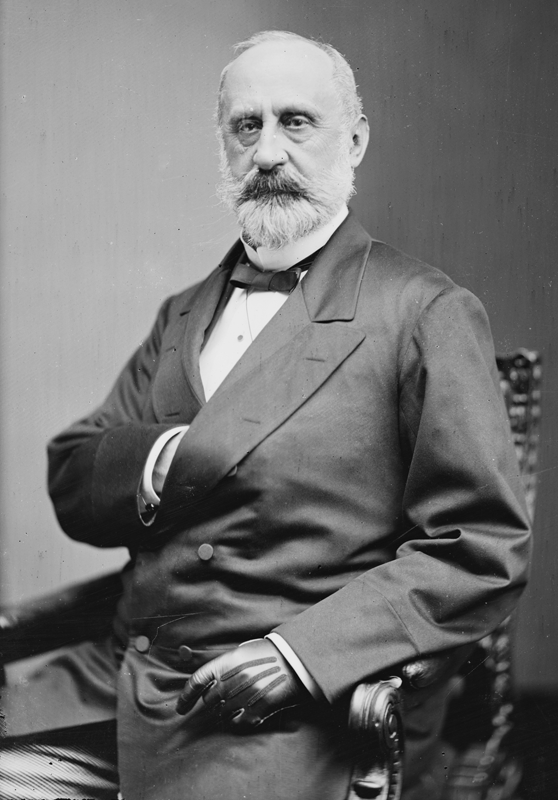
Charles Devens

Charles Devens was born in Charlestown, Massachusetts, United States on April 4, 1820. In his youth, he attended the Boston Latin School. He graduated from Harvard College in 1838 and received a Bachelor of Laws degree from Harvard Law School in 1840. He began practicing law in 1841. Devens became involved in politics shortly thereafter, serving as a member of the Massachusetts Senate from Franklin County between 1848 and 1849, and between 1849 and 1853, he served as the United States marshal for the United States District Court for the District of Massachusetts. During the American Civil War, Devens served in the Union Army as the major of a rifle battalion and later as colonel of the 15th Massachusetts Infantry Regiment. By the end of the war, Devens had reached the rank of general and had been wounded at both the Battle of Fair Oaks and the Battle of Chancellorsville. He resumed his law career following the war and in 1873 became an associate justice for the Massachusetts Supreme Judicial Court. In 1877, he was appointed the United States Attorney General by President Rutherford B. Hayes, a position he would hold until 1881. Devens would later die in Boston on January 7, 1891.

=== Creation ===
Efforts towards the erection of a monument honoring Devens began in late 1891 when United States Senator George Frisbie Hoar of Massachusetts sent requests to many prominent citizens from Worcester with the following letter on November 9:

Dear Sir: You are respectfully invited to attend a meeting to take measures for erecting in Worcester a monument and statue to Gen. Devens to be held at the Worcester Club House on Elm Street, Friday, Nov. 13th, at half-past seven o'clock P. M.

At the meeting, a committee of 35 men was formed for the purposes of raising funds for the monument, and a circular discussing the monument and its projected cost of $15,000 was prepared. However, no further action was taken by the committee, and the project languished for about a decade. The idea for a monument was revived in fall 1901 during a meeting of the veterans' organization for the 15th Massachusetts Infantry Regiment. A committee was formed by the organization, and in March 1902, a general committee consisting of many prominent citizens from the area was formed. Notable members included Hoar, Rufus B. Dodge Jr. (mayor of Worcester), Thomas Corwin Mendenhall (president of the Worcester Polytechnic Institute), Daniel Merriman (president of the Worcester Art Museum), and multiple members of the veterans' organization, among others. On April 4, 1902, the Massachusetts General Court granted an act of incorporation on the "Worcester County Memorial Devens' Statue Commission".

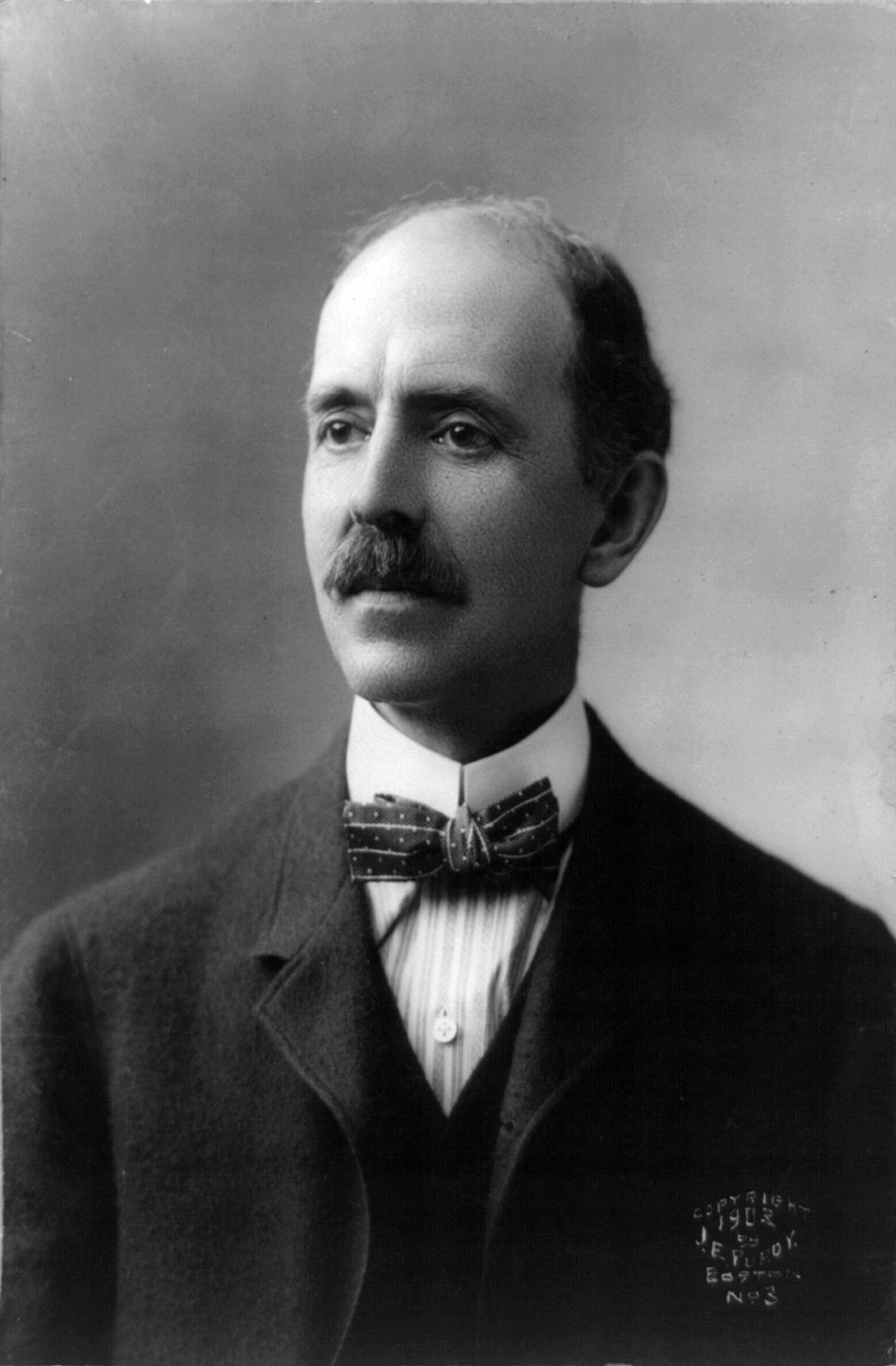
Daniel Chester French

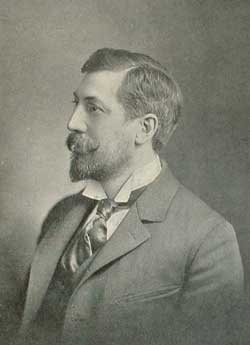
Edward Clark Potter

Following this, the commission began to raise public funds for the monument. The city of Worcester appropriated $7,500, while $5,000 was appropriated by Worcester County, with roughly $4,000 in additional funding appropriated by several other towns in the county. On July 12, 1902, the commission voted to hire the sculptors Daniel Chester French and Edward Clark Potter to design an equestrian statue of Devens, at a cost of no more than $30,000. French and Potter had collaborated on several equestrian statues before this, and as with their previous collaborations, French was responsible for the human part of the statue, while Potter was responsible for the horse. On November 27, 1903, the sculptors submitted a model of the proposed statue, which was accepted by the commission. Additionally, the architect Robert D. Andrews from Boston was hired to design the pedestal for the statue. The George D. Webb Granite and Construction Co. was contracted to create the pedestal, while Jno. Williams, Inc., a foundry in New York City, was responsible for the creation of tablets and letterings that would be fixed to the pedestal. On October 17, 1903, the commission accepted the final design of the statue by French and Potter, and subsequently, the model was sent to the Gorham Manufacturing Company in Providence, Rhode Island for casting. Senator Hoar had managed to get several condemned cannons to be appropriated by the United States Congress to be used in the casting, with a total value of approximately $2,000.

=== Dedication ===
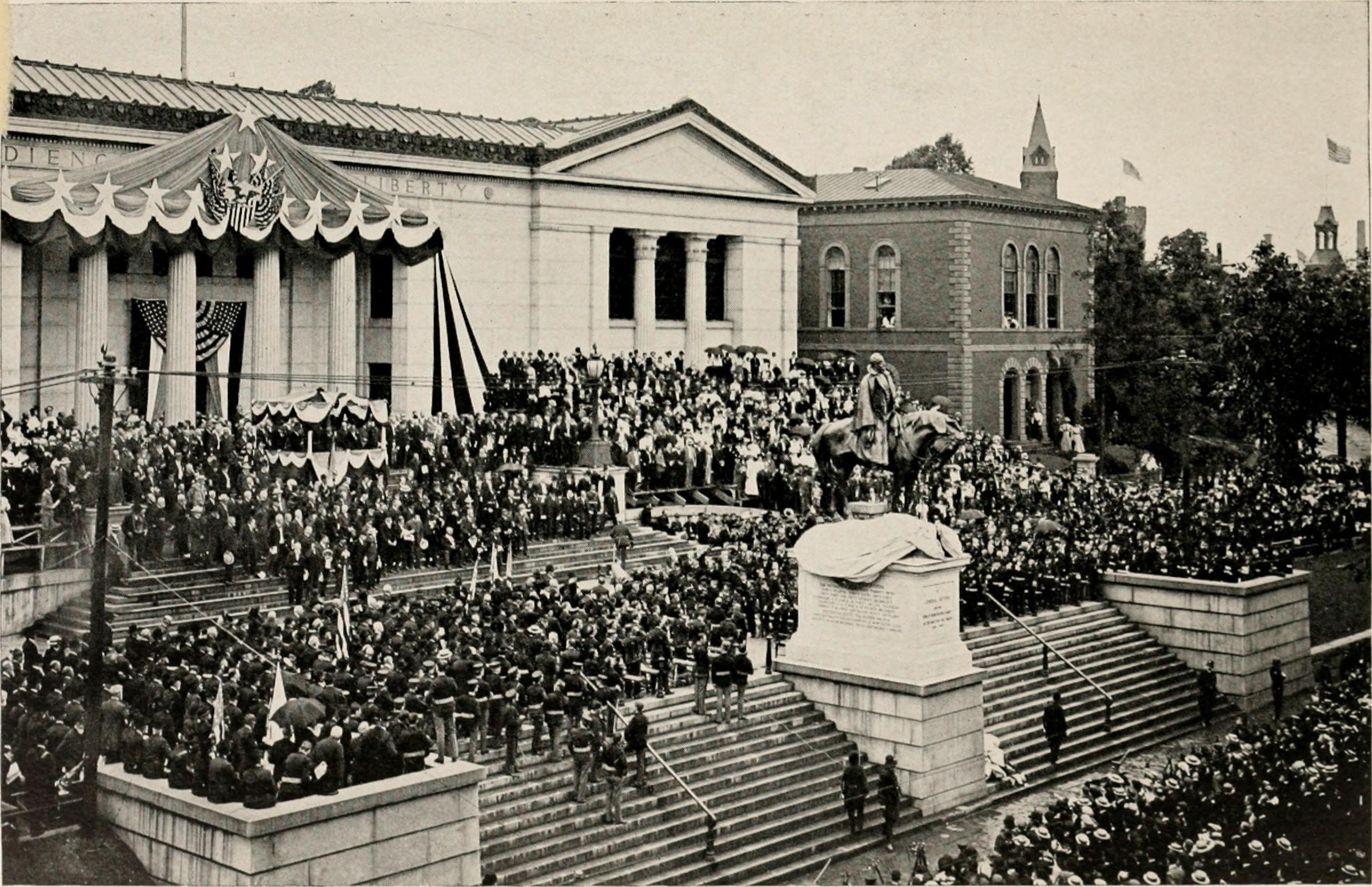
Dedication ceremony

In December 1905, work on the monument was nearing completion, and the commission assembled a committee to plan the statue's dedication. The committee petitioned the city council of Worcester for permission to place the monument on public land in front of the Worcester County Court House, which was granted. The unveiling ceremony took place on July 4, 1906 (Independence Day) in front of the courthouse, with approximately 250 militia members and over 1,000 Civil War veterans in attendance. A parade was held, with Massachusetts Governor Curtis Guild Jr. and Worcester mayor John T. Duggan present, during which the state colors of the 15th Regiment, which had been carried during the Battle of Antietam, were carried. Every post of the Grand Army of the Republic was represented in the parade. Seats on the courthouse steps were set up for many of the veterans, while a speaking platform was built at the top of the steps. The parade, which followed mostly along the city's main street, ended around 10 a.m., with the veterans seated by 10:30 a.m.

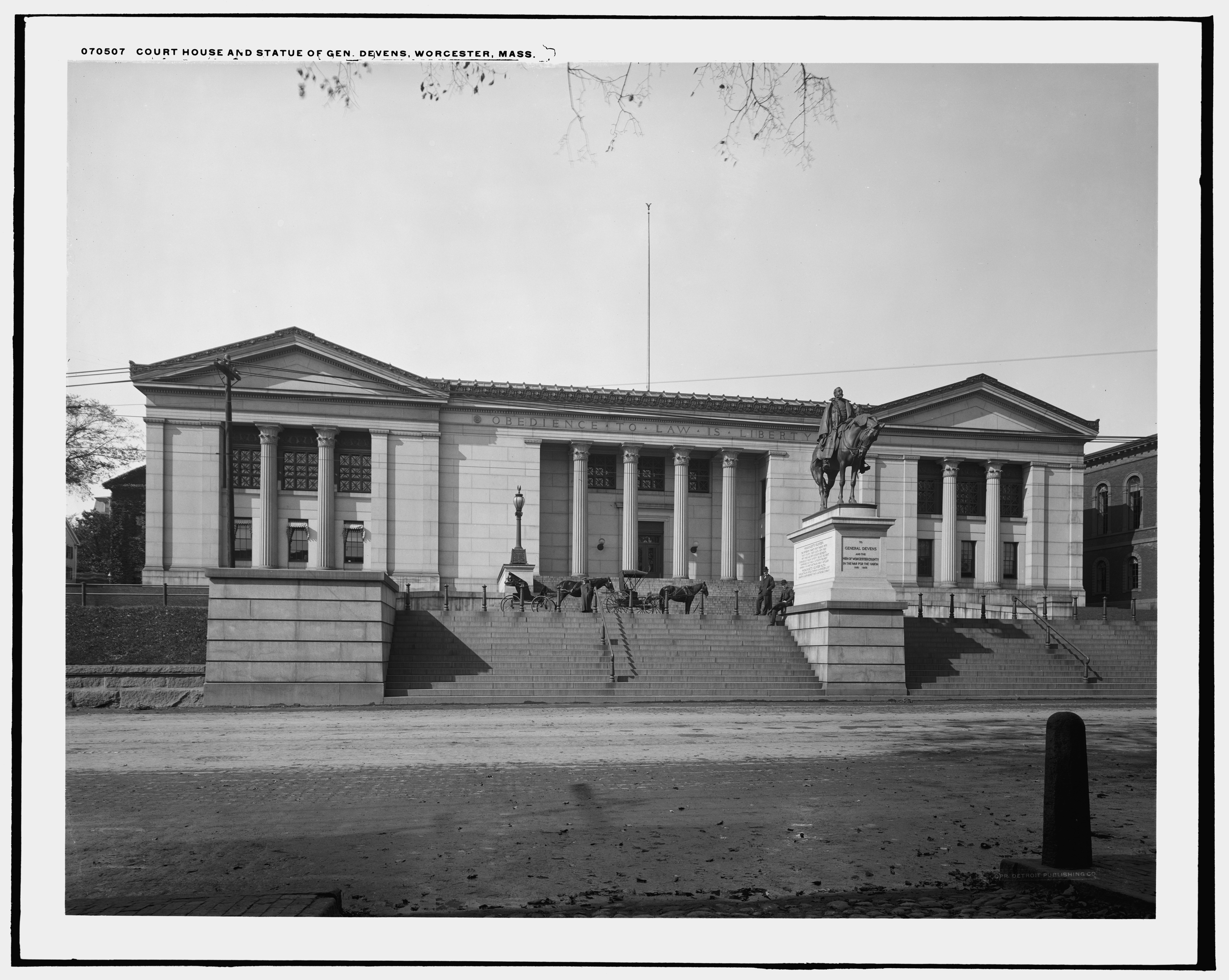
The statue in front of the courthouse, from the Detroit Publishing Company, c. 1908

The speakers assembled at the top of the steps included Governor Guild, Lieutenant Governor Eben Sumner Draper, Secretary of War William Howard Taft, and Chief Justice Marcus Perrin Knowlton and associate justice Henry Braley of the Massachusetts Supreme Judicial Court, among others. Shortly before 11 a.m., William Franklin Draper (who had become the head of the commission following Hoar's death in 1904) called the ceremony to order, with Merriman (a reverend) giving a prayer. Following the prayer, Governor Guild gave a speech celebrating Devens and highlighting his contributions to the state, which was followed by a speech by William Draper. Afterwards, Charles Devens Osborne, a grandnephew of Devens, officially unveiled the statue. The band played "The Star-Spangled Banner" amidst cheers from the crowd, and afterwards, a member of the county commissioners officially accepted the statue on behalf of the county. Afterwards, William Draper introduced Stewart L. Woodford, a politician and former Union Army officer from New York, as the orator for the ceremony. Following his speech, the band played "America", and after the end of the ceremony, veterans were treated to a luncheon in the city's armory. In total, approximately 10,000 spectators were present for the ceremony.

=== Recent history ===
In 1950, during an expansion of the court house building, the statue was moved several feet, and today the statue stands at the intersection of Main Street and Highland Street, still on the court house grounds, overlooking Lincoln Square. In 1994, the monument was surveyed as part of the Save Outdoor Sculpture! project. In 2015, the old court house, which had been vacant since 2008, was sold to developers with the intent to convert the building to apartments. As part of the sale, agreements were made regarding continued historic preservation of the property by the developers, including for the Devens statue. A 2017 article in the Telegram & Gazette discussing renovations to the building stated that the statue would remain in place in front of the courthouse.

== Design ==
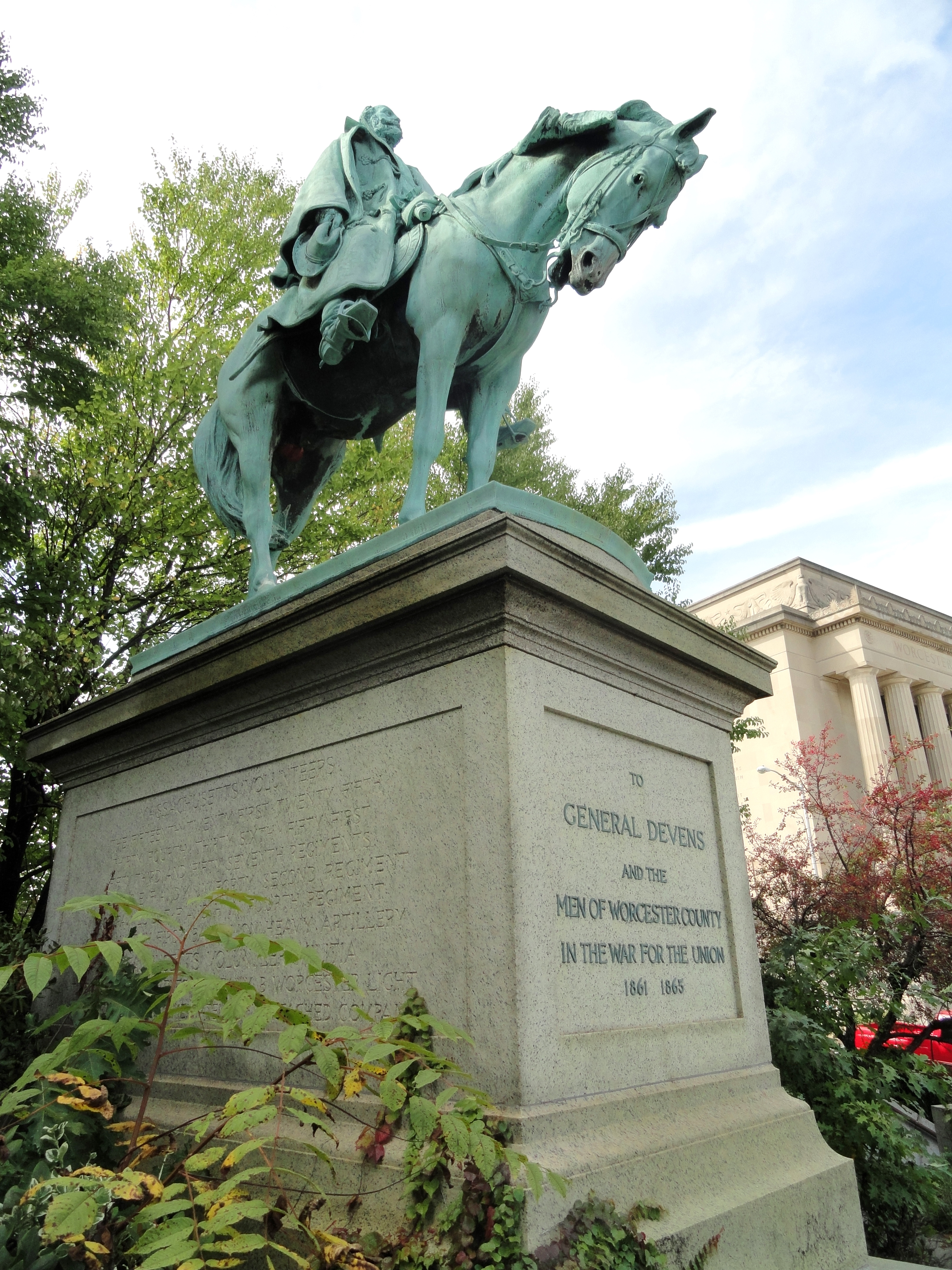
View of the statue showing front and side inscriptions on the pedestal

The monument consists of a bronze equestrian statue of Devens atop a rectangular granite pedestal. Devens is depicted in his Civil War uniform, partially covered by a heavy coat, with his right hand holding the horse's reigns. The statue stands 25 feet (7.6 m) tall, while the pedestal is approximately 15.8 feet (4.8 m) tall. The width of the pedestal is approximately 9.7 feet (3.0 m). A bronze tablet affixed to the rear of the pedestal bears the following inscription:

CHARLES DEVENS / SOLDIER, ORATOR, JURIST / 1820–1891 / MAJOR, THIRD BATTALION MASS. RIFLES / APRIL, 1861 / COLONEL, FIFTEENTH REGIMENT MASS. VOL. INFANTRY / JULY, 1861 / BRIGADIER GENERAL, UNITED STATES VOLUNTEERS / 1862 / BREVET MAJOR GENERAL, UNITED STATES VOLUNTEERS / 1865 / ASSOCIATE JUSTICE, SUPERIOR COURT OF MASS. / APRIL, 1867 / ASSOCIATE JUSTICE, SUPREME COURT OF MASS. / 1873 / ATTORNEY GENERAL OF THE UNITED STATES / 1877 / ASSOCIATE JUSTICE, SUPREME COURT OF MASS. / 1881–1891

The inscription on the front of the pedestal reads:

TO / GENERAL DEVENS / AND THE / MEN OF WORCESTER COUNTY / IN THE WAR FOR THE UNION / 1861–1865

Additionally, the commission specified "[t]hat on the south side of the base the several organizations known as Worcester County Regiments, Battalions and Companies be placed, and on the north side of the base the names of the several cities and towns, with the number of men furnished by each." These organizations, inscribed on the left side of the base, are as follows:

MASSACHUSETTS VOLUNTEERS / THE FIFTEENTH TWENTY-FIRST TWENTY-FIFTH / THIRTY-FOURTH THIRTY-SIXTH FIFTY-FIRST / FIFTY THIRD AND FIFTY SEVENTH REGIMENTS / COMPANIES E F AND K IN FORTY SECOND REGIMENT / COMPANIES D E F AND H IN FOURTH REGIMENT / COMPANY F IN FIRST BATTALION HEAVY ARTILLERY / MASSACHUSETTS VOLUNTEER MILITIA / THIRD BATTALION RIFLES COMPANY B WORCESTER LIGHT / INFANTRY IN SIXTH REGIMENT TENTH UNATTACHED COMPANY.

=== Analysis ===
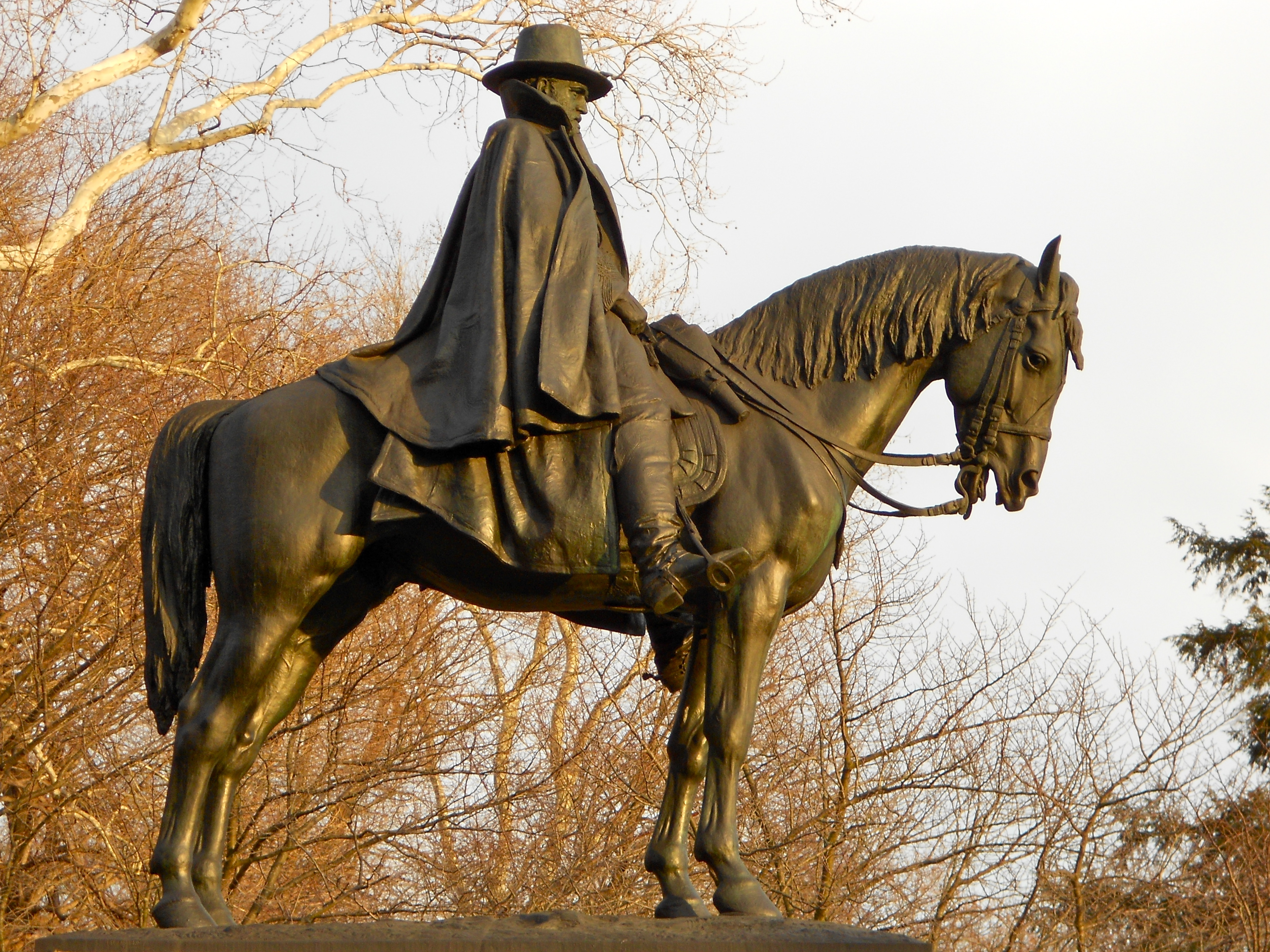
Equestrian statue of Ulysses S. Grant, an earlier work by French and Potter

Art historian Michael Richman compared the statue to a similar equestrian statue of Ulysses S. Grant created several years earlier by French and Potter in Philadelphia, saying it was "reminiscent of the Grant without being imitative." In a 2019 work on Civil War memorials in the United States, Thomas J. Brown stated that "[t]he decision to honor Devens as a military leader typified the recent reconfiguration of American priorities" and that while Devens "failed to achieve much battlefield success", the decision to represent him as a soldier was articulated by Hoar, who said, "whatever may be said by the philosopher, the moralist, or the preacher, the instincts of the greater portion of mankind will lead them to award the highest meed of admiration to the military character." Discussing both the Devens statue and a later equestrian statue French created for William Franklin Draper, Brown argues that "[i]n French's statues of Devens and Draper, the lawyer and the industrialist blended into the army general, celebrating the extraction of obedience through compulsion."

Discussing French's works in a 2019 book, historian Harold Holzer stated that "[b]y the time the Devens statue was dedicated in 1906, the team of French and Potter had clearly established an aesthetically pleasing and financially lucrative formula to portray Civil War 'heroes'," but that French was growing tired of the genre, pointing out that it would be six years before French created another equestrian statue of a Civil War figure.

== See also ==
- 1906 in art
- List of equestrian statues in the United States
- List of Union Civil War monuments and memorials
- Public sculptures by Daniel Chester French

== Bibliography ==
- Barnes, George (June 27, 2020a). "Pondering the complexity of historical figures". Telegram & Gazette. Gannett. Archived from the original on January 8, 2021.
- Barnes, George (November 11, 2020b). "Veterans Day: Worcester war memorials worth a visit". Telegram & Gazette. Gannett. Archived from the original on January 10, 2021.
- Brown, Thomas J. (2019). Civil War Monuments and the Militarization of America. University of North Carolina Press. ISBN 978-1-4696-5375-4 – via Google Books.
- Croteau, Scott J. (March 19, 2015). "Worcester finds buyer for former courthouse building on Main Street". MassLive.com. Advance Publications. Archived from the original on November 8, 2020.
- Holzer, Harold (2019). Monument Man: The Life and Art of Daniel Chester French. Princeton Architectural Press. ISBN 978-1-61689-829-8 – via Google Books.
- Kotsopoulos, Nick (October 5, 2017). "Worcester County Courthouse rehab gets green light". Telegram & Gazette. Gannett. Archived from the original on September 17, 2018.
- Kotsopoulos, Nick (January 7, 2019). "Rehab of old Worcester County Courthouse to start in spring". Telegram & Gazette. Gannett. Archived from the original on September 18, 2020.
- Nutt, Charles (1919). History of Worcester and Its People. Vol. III. Lewis Historical Publishing Company – via Google Books.
- "General Devens Memorial, (sculpture)". Smithsonian Institution Research Information System. Archived from the original on May 21, 2021.
- Southwick, Albert B. (April 16, 2015). "The saga of Courthouse Hill". Telegram & Gazette. GateHouse Media. Archived from the original on January 9, 2021 – via The Free Library.
- "Attorney General: Charles Devens". United States Department of Justice. July 5, 2017. Archived from the original on October 17, 2018.
- Dedication of the Equestrian Statue of Major-General Charles Devens: And of the Monument to the Soldiers of Worcester County in the War for the Union, July 4th, 1906. Worcester County Memorial Devens' Statue Commission. Commonwealth Press. 1907 – via Google Books.
