= Statue of Austin Blair =

Statue in Lansing, Michigan, United States

Austin Blair
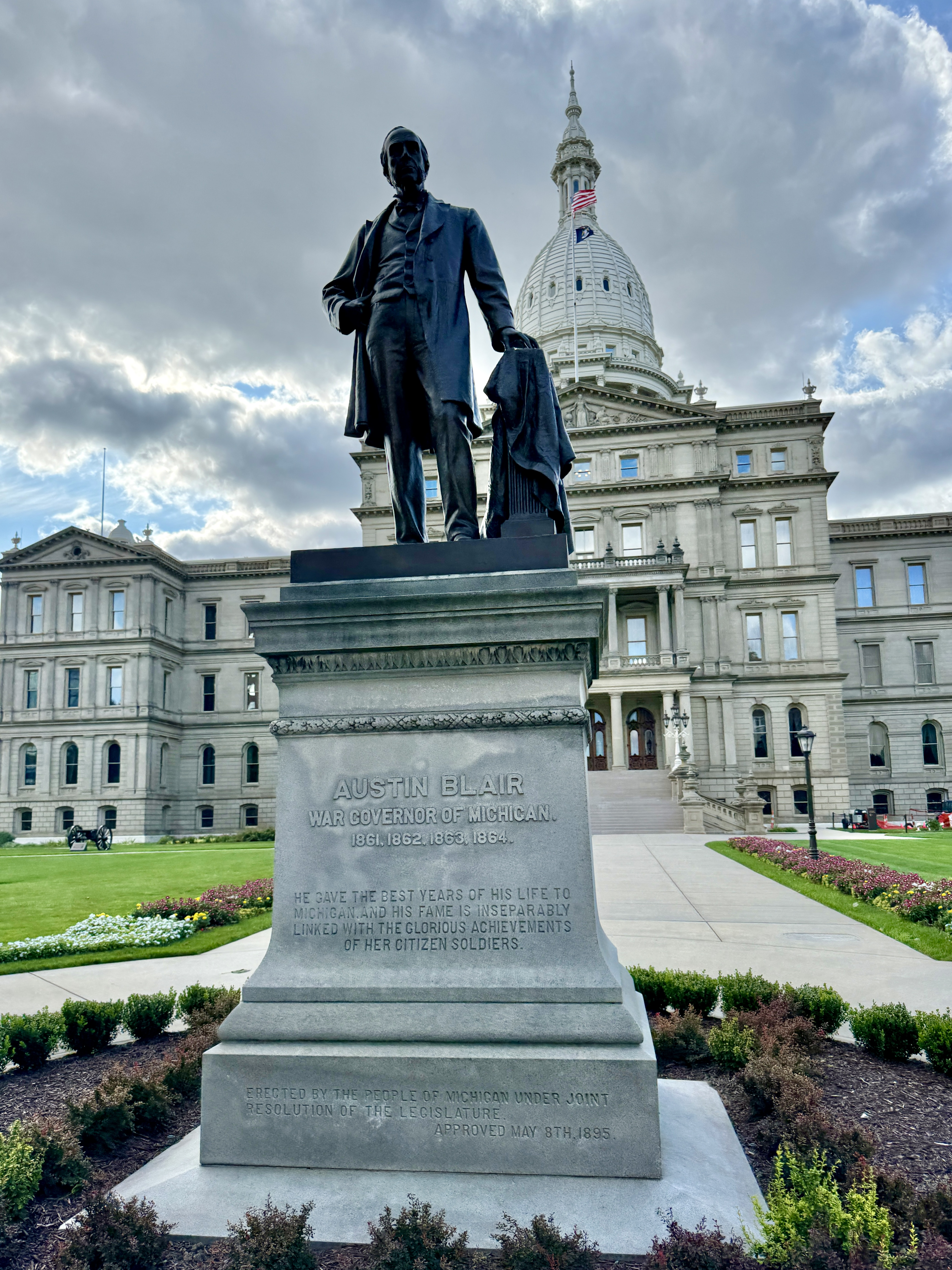
- The statue in front of the Michigan State Capitol, pictured 2024
- Interactive map of Austin Blair
- Location: Michigan State Capitol, Lansing, Michigan, United States
- Coordinates: 42°44′1″N 84°33′16″W
- Designer: Edward Clark Potter (statue); Donaldson and Meier (pedestal)
- Fabricator: Bureau Brothers Foundry (statue); C. W. Hills Steam Granite Works (pedestal)
- Type: Statue
- Material: Bronze (statue); Granite (pedestal)
- Length: 6 feet 4 inches (1.93 m)
- Width: 6 feet 4 inches (1.93 m)
- Height: 17 feet 7.5 inches (5.372 m)
- Beginning date: 1897
- Completion date: 1898
- Dedicated date: October 12, 1898
- Restored date: 1989
- Dedicated to: Austin Blair

Austin Blair is a monument located on the grounds of the Michigan State Capitol in Lansing, Michigan, United States. It consists of a bronze statue that was designed by sculptor Edward Clark Potter atop a granite pedestal that was designed by the architectural firm of Donaldson and Meier. It was dedicated in 1898 in honor of Austin Blair, a politician who had served as the governor of Michigan and as a member of the United States House of Representatives.

Oscar A. Janes, a member of the Michigan Senate, first proposed the creation of the monument in a joint resolution he introduced in 1895, a year after Blair's death. The proposal received significant support from veterans of the American Civil War, as Blair had served as governor during that time. Potter was commissioned in December 1895, with a model produced in 1897 and the casting completed by the Bureau Brothers Foundry in January 1898. The monument was dedicated on October 12 of that year, in a ceremony that attracted several thousand visitors to Lansing and featured several notable attendees, including Governor Hazen S. Pingree and Major General William Rufus Shafter (a Civil War veteran).

The statue was restored by Venus Bronze Works in 1989 as part of a larger restoration project at the capitol. As of 2025, it is the only monument on the capitol grounds dedicated to a single person. Additionally, per the newspaper City Pulse, the monument is one of only two monuments and memorials in the United States—alongside the Lincoln Memorial—to explicitly mention slavery as a cause of the Civil War.

== History ==
=== Background ===
Austin Blair was a politician active in Michigan in the mid-19th century. Following his move to Jackson, Michigan, in 1841, he participated in local politics and, over the next several years, served several terms in the Michigan Legislature in both the Senate and the House of Representatives. A strident abolitionist, he helped to establish the Republican Party in 1854 and fought against state enforcement of the Fugitive Slave Act of 1850. In 1860, he was elected governor of Michigan, serving during the American Civil War from 1861 to 1865. As governor, he directed over 90,000 people from the state to fight in the war. Following his governorship, he served as a member of the United States House of Representatives and, later, as a member of the Regents of the University of Michigan. He died in 1894 at the age of 76.

=== Creation ===
Following Blair's death, veterans of the Civil War began to campaign for the erection of a statue in his honor. In 1895, Oscar A. Janes—a member of the Michigan Senate and a veteran of the 4th Michigan Infantry Regiment—authored a joint resolution for the construction of a statue of Blair. Veterans were largely supportive of the measure and petitioned other legislators to vote in its favor. Ultimately, the state legislature voted nearly unanimously for the monument project, which would see a statue of Blair placed on the grounds of the Michigan State Capitol. The government of Michigan allocated $10,000 (equivalent to $387,000 in 2025) towards this project, which would be overseen by three commissioners. Governor John T. Rich appointed Russell A. Alger (a former governor of Michigan), Dwight Smith, and William H. Withington as commissioners. Per the terms of the legislation, at least two of the commissioners had to be veterans, with both Alger and Withington having served as generals in the Union army during the Civil War. Smith died prior to the project's completion, prompting John Patton Jr. to replace him on the board.

The board of commissioners selected sculptor Edward Clark Potter, whose sister lived in the state capital of Lansing, to design the statue, paying him $7,200 ($279,000 in 2025) for his work. He was commissioned by the government in December 1895 and created a model in 1897. The Bureau Brothers Foundry of Philadelphia performed the casting for the statue, which was completed in January 1898. Meanwhile, the Detroit-based architectural firm of Donaldson and Meier were hired to design the statue's pedestal, which was created by the C. W. Hills Steam Granite Works of Jackson. In total, the creation and installation of the monument cost $9,791 ($378,912 in 2025).

=== Dedication ===
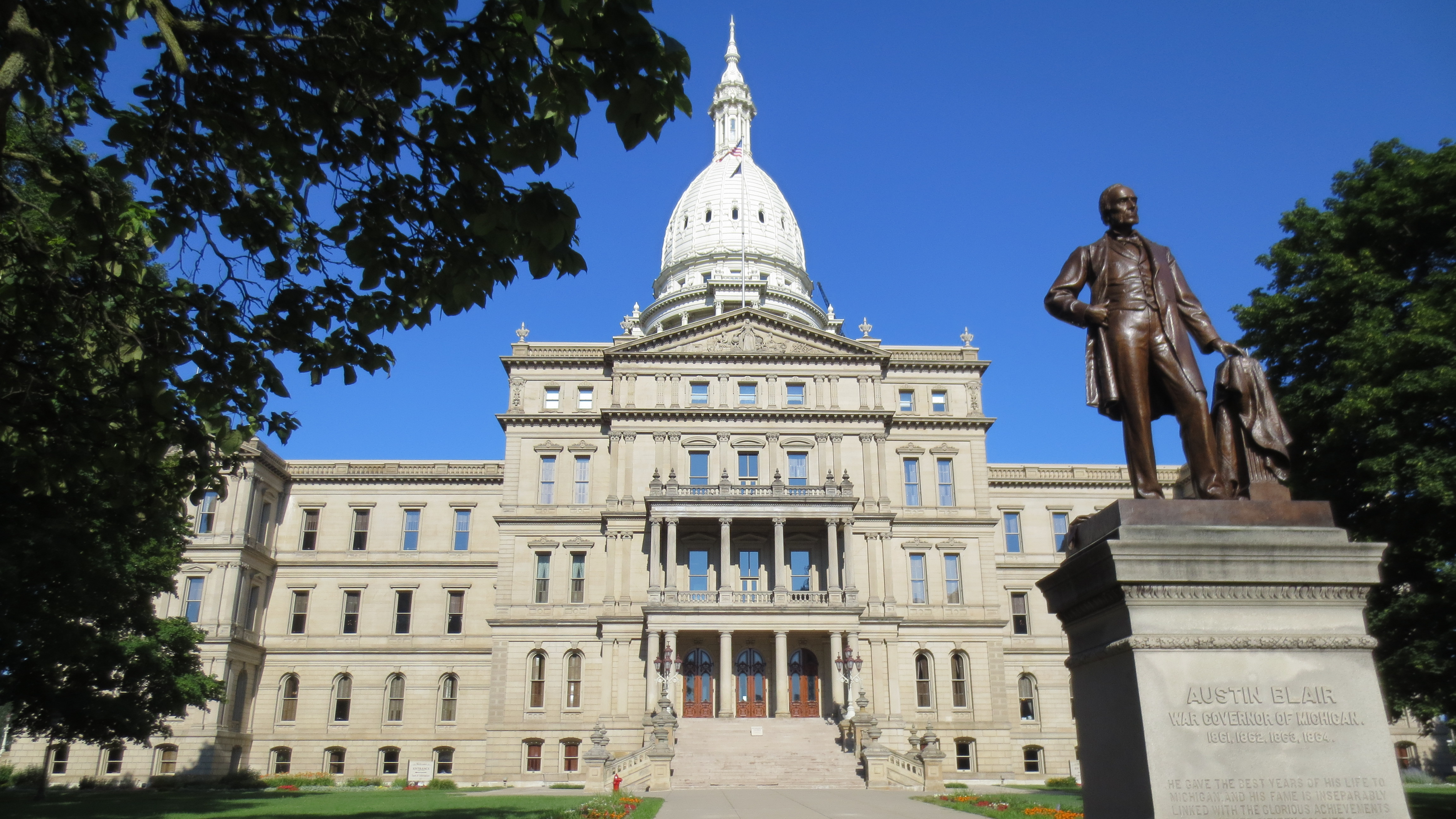
The capitol with the monument in the foreground, pictured 2013

The monument was dedicated on October 12, 1898. According to the Michigan Farmer magazine, there was a sentiment that the event should serve as a "grand peace jubilee" due to the recent end of the Spanish–American War. The event attracted a large number of people from outside of Lansing, with estimates giving figures of approximately 25,000 to 30,000. The number of people coming from Jackson, Blair's hometown, was so sizable that 18 railroad cars were required to carry them.

The dedication ceremony featured a large parade that included Civil War veterans carrying battle flags from the war. Several notable attendees were present for the ceremony, including Governor Hazen S. Pingree, William Rufus Shafter (a major general in the United States Army who served in both the Civil War and the Spanish–American War), and members of both the United States Congress and the Grand Army of the Republic. The statue was given to the state by Withington (a native of Blair's hometown of Jackson) and accepted by Governor Pingree. The keynote speech for the event was given by John Patton Jr., a former United States Senator, who spoke before a large crowd that gathered on the capitol grounds and flowed into the surrounding streets. The statue itself, which was covered by two American flags, was unveiled by two of Blair's granddaughters.

=== Later history ===
Two years after the monument's dedication, the state government approved a $183 ($7,082 in 2025) project to improve pedestrian access around the statue by widening and expanding a walkway to it. Throughout the 20th century, the monument has been climbed upon by numerous protestors at the capitol, including anti-Vietnam War demonstrators and motorcyclists protesting a helmet law. By 1989, the statue had suffered from decades of weathering, prompting its removal and restoration, which occurred as part of a larger capitol restoration project. The statue was removed on January 19 of that year and treated by Venus Bronze Works, with its reinstallation occurring on May 4. In 1993, the monument was surveyed as part of the Save Outdoor Sculpture! program.

By the 2010s, the statue was only one of several memorials to Blair located throughout the state. However, as of 2025, the statue is the only monument on the capitol grounds that recognizes an individual person. In 2023, to coincide with the 125th anniversary of the statue's dedication, several talks about Blair were scheduled to take place at the capitol, with the event open to the public.

== Design ==
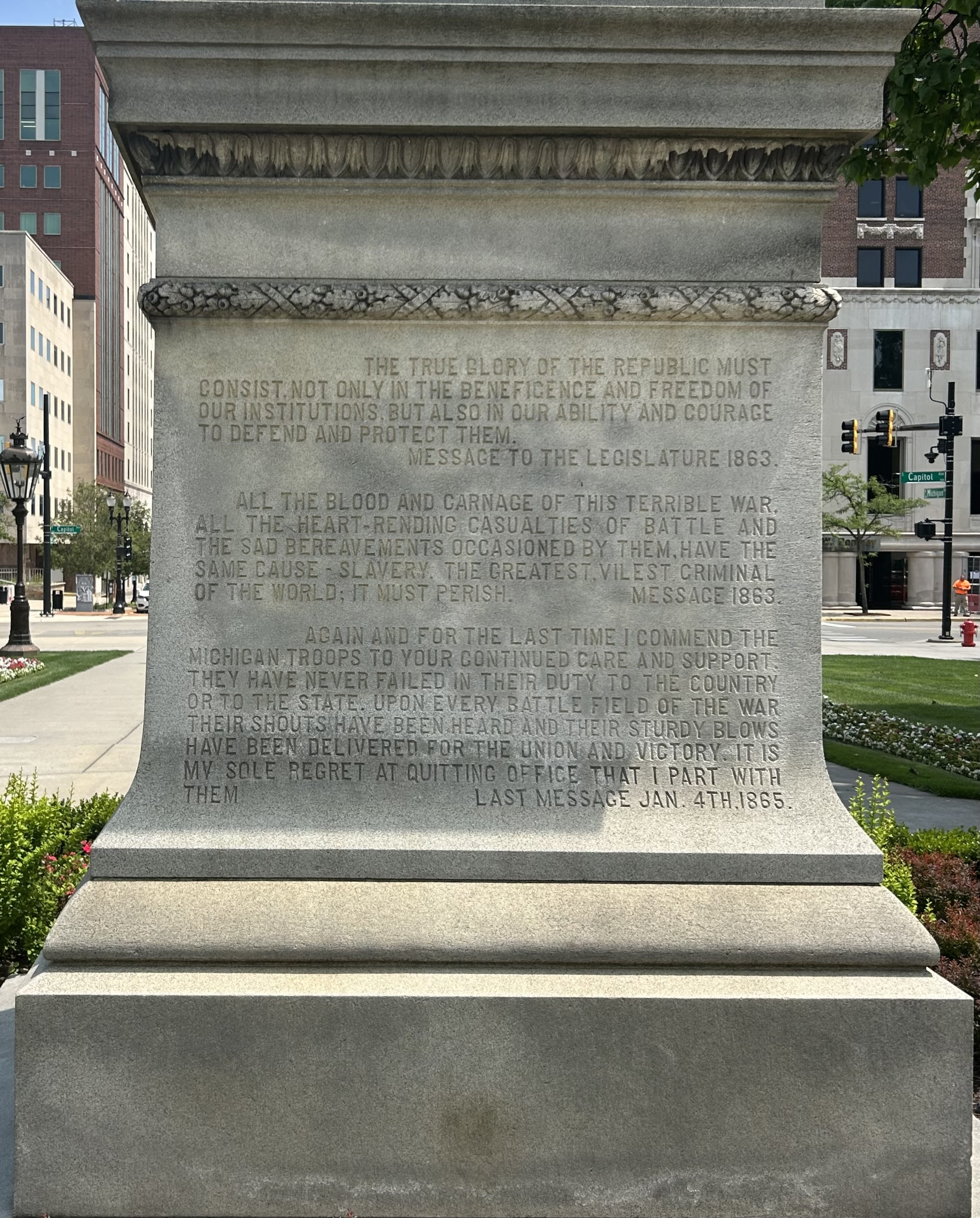
Three quotes from Blair are inscribed on the rear of the pedestal (pictured 2025).

The monument is located in front of the main entrance of the capitol. It consists of a bronze statue of Blair atop a granite pedestal. The statue has a height of 8 feet 11 inches (2.72 m) and has a square base with side measurements of 4 feet 9 inches (1.45 m). Meanwhile, the pedestal is 8 feet 8.5 inches (2.654 m) tall and has a square base with side measurements of 6 feet 4 inches (1.93 m).

The statue depicts Blair, standing, as he is about to give a speech. His right hand is on his hip, while his left hand rests on a column that is draped by a flag. At the base of the bronze sculpture are marks indicating the sculptor ("E.C. Potter / SCULPTOR 1897") and the foundry ("BUREAU BROTHS / BRONZE FOUNDERS"). The front of the pedestal bears the following inscription:

AUSTIN BLAIR / WAR GOVERNOR OF MICHIGAN. / 1861, 1862, 1863, 1864. / HE GAVE THE BEST YEARS OF HIS LIFE TO / MICHIGAN, AND HIS FAME IS INSEPARABLY / LINKED WITH THE GLORIOUS ACHIEVEMENTS / OF HER CITIZEN SOLDIERS. / ERECTED BY THE PEOPLE OF MICHIGAN UNDER JOINT / RESOLUTION OF THE LEGISLATURE. / APPROVED MAY 8TH, 1895.

Meanwhile, the back of the pedestal bears three quotes from Blair:

THE TRUE GLORY OF THE REPUBLIC MUST / CONSIST, NOT ONLY IN THE BENEFICENCE AND FREEDOM OF / OUR INSTITUTIONS, BUT ALSO IN OUR ABILITY AND COURAGE / TO DEFEND AND PROTECT THEM. / MESSAGE TO THE LEGISLATURE 1863.

ALL THE BLOOD AND CARNAGE OF THIS TERRIBLE WAR, / ALL THE HEART-RENDING CASUALTIES OF BATTLE AND / THE SAD BEREAVEMENTS OCCASIONED BY THEM, HAVE THE / SAME CAUSE--SLAVERY. THE GREATEST, VILEST CRIMINAL / OF THE WORLD; IT MUST PERISH. MESSAGE 1863.

AGAIN AND FOR THE LAST TIME I COMMEND THE / MICHIGAN TROOPS TO YOUR CONTINUED CARE AND SUPPORT. / THEY HAVE NEVER FAILED IN THEIR DUTY TO THE COUNTRY / OR TO THE STATE. UPON EVERY BATTLEFIELD OF THE WAR / THEIR SHOUTS HAVE BEEN HEARD AND THEIR STURDY BLOWS / HAVE BEEN DELIVERED FOR THE UNION AND VICTORY. IT IS / MY SOLE REGRET AT QUITTING OFFICE THAT I PART WITH THEM. LAST MESSAGE JAN. 4TH, 1865.

According to the newspaper City Pulse, the monument is one of only 50 monuments and memorials in the United States to mention slavery and one of only two—the other being the Lincoln Memorial—to identify it as a cause of the Civil War.

== See also ==
- List of Union Civil War monuments and memorials
