= Bureau Brothers Foundry =

Foundry in Philadelphia, US

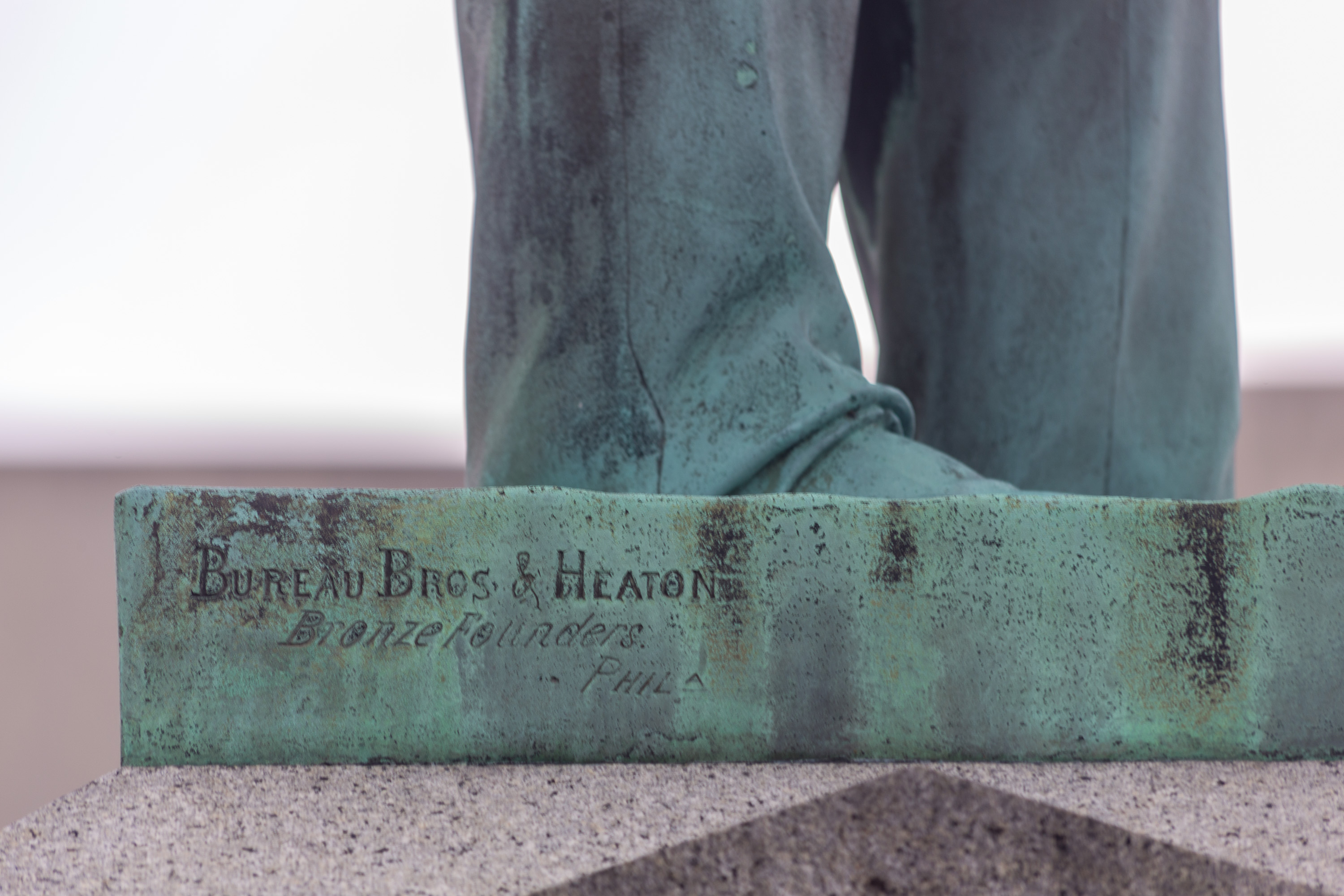
Bureau Bros foundry mark on the Civil War memorial in Elmira, New York

Bureau Brothers Foundry was a foundry established by two French immigrants, Achille and Edouard Bureau, in Philadelphia, Pennsylvania, USA, in the 1870s. It was one of America's premier art foundries for many years, and cast works by some of the nation's leading sculptors.

In 1892, the foundry was located at the west corner of 21st Street and Allegheny Avenue in Philadelphia. By 1913, it had moved to the southeast corner of 23rd and Westmoreland Streets in North Philadelphia.

In the late 20th century, the long-idled North Philadelphia building was used by a piano tuner to hold more than 200 pianos over two decades. In 2013, the building was taken over by Philadelphia Salvage, an architectural salvage company.

== Works ==
| Title | Image | Artist | Year | Location | Coordinates | Material | Dimensions | Owner |
|---|---|---|---|---|---|---|---|---|
| Major General George Henry Thomas | | John Quincy Adams Ward | 1879 | Thomas Circle, Washington, D.C. | | Bronze | 16 feet (4.9 m) | National Park Service |
| Monument to the N.Y. Vols. 107 | | | 1881 | Elmira, New York | | Bronze | | |
| The Silent Sentry | Silent Sentry | Achille Bureau | 1883 | Laurel Hill Cemetery, Philadelphia, Pennsylvania | | Bronze | 7 feet (2.1 m) | Military Order of the Loyal Legion of the United States |
| Orestes and Pylades | | Herman Kirn (from original by Carl Johann Steinhäuser) | 1884 | Oxford Street Entrance to Fairmount Park | | Bronze | | |
| The Puritan (Springfield) | | Augustus Saint-Gaudens | 1887 | Springfield, Massachusetts | | Bronze | | |
| Dickens and Little Nell | | Francis Edwin Elwell | 1890 | Clark Park, West Philadelphia | 39°56′55″N 75°12′34″W | Bronze | | City of Philadelphia |
| 42nd New York Infantry Memorial | | John J. Boyle | 1891 | Gettysburg, Pennsylvania | | Bronze | | |
| General Ulysses S. Grant | | Daniel Chester French & Edward Clark Potter | 1898 | Kelly Drive | 39°58′51″N 75°11′52″W | Bronze | 174 in | City of Philadelphia |
| Austin Blair | | Edward Clark Potter | 1898 | Michigan State Capitol in Lansing, MI | | Bronze | ~20–25 ft tall | Michigan Legislature |
| John L. Burns | | Albert George Bureau (b. 1871; likely related to the Bureau Brothers) | 1903 | Gettysburg, Pennsylvania | | Bronze | | |
| Coming of the White Man | | Hermon Atkins MacNeil | 1904 | Washington Park in Portland, Oregon | | Bronze | | |
| Statue of General Wayne | | Henry Kirk Bush-Brown | 1907 | Valley Forge National Historical Park, Pennsylvania | | Bronze | 168 inches tall | |
| Lincoln Statue | | W. Granville Hastings | 1918 | Greene County Courthouse, Jefferson, Iowa | 42°00′56″N 94°22′27″W | Bronze | Lifesize | Greene County, Iowa |
| Thorfinn Karlsefni | | Einar Jónsson | 1920 | Fairmount Park, Philadelphia, Pennsylvania | | Bronze | 88 inches tall | |
| Nuns of the Battlefield | | Jerome Connor | 1924 | Civil War Nurses Memorial, 1700 block of Rhode Island Avenue NW, Washington, D.C. | 38°54′21″N 77°02′25″W | Bronze | Lifesize | |
