= Equestrian statue of Ulysses S. Grant =

Statue in Philadelphia, PA, US

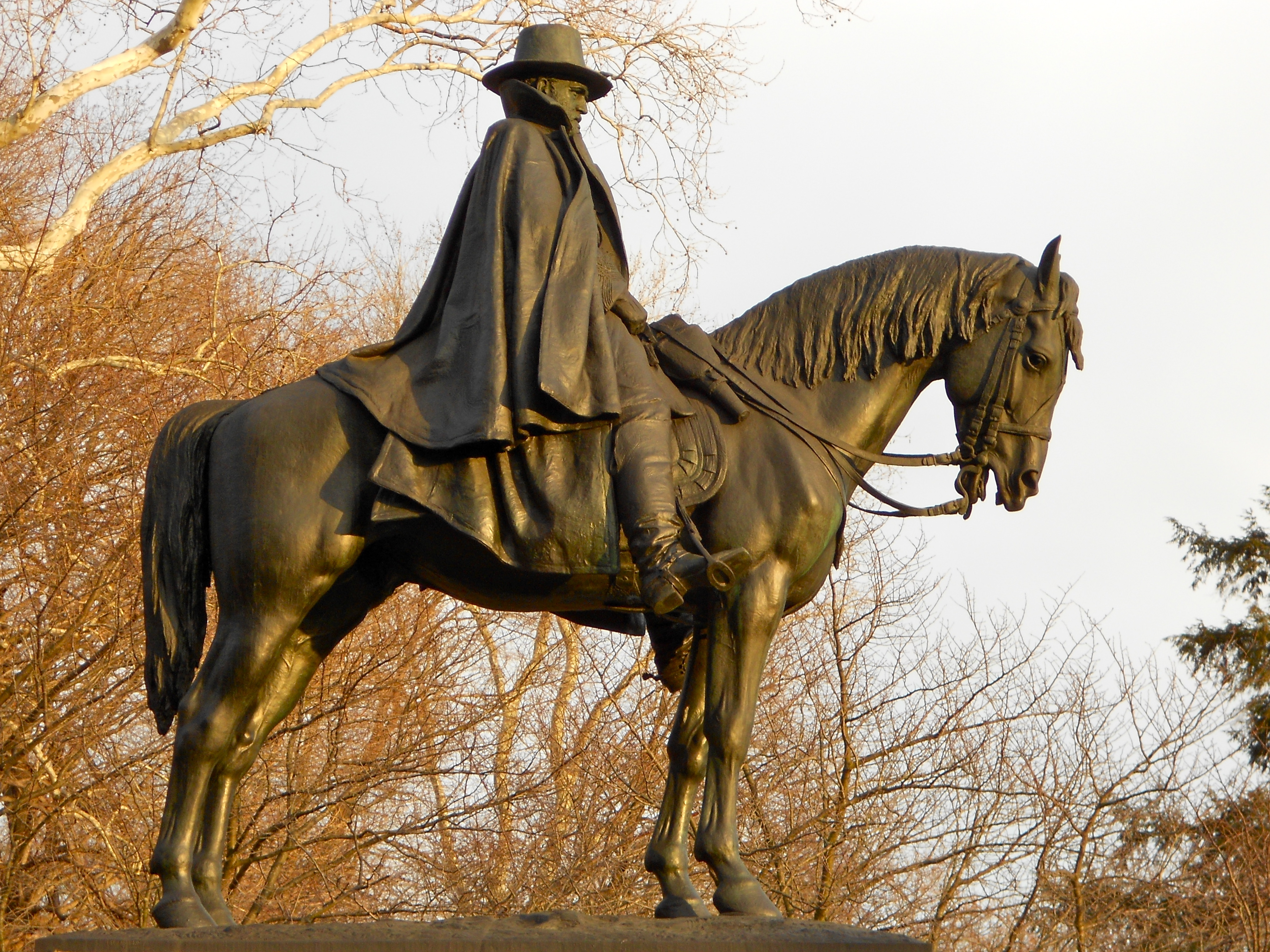
- Closeup of the statue
- Interactive map of Equestrian statue of Ulysses S. Grant
- Location: Fairmount Park, Philadelphia, Pennsylvania, United States
- Coordinates: 39°58′51″N 75°11′52″W
- Designer: Daniel Chester French; Edward Clark Potter; Frank Miles Day & Brother (pedestal)
- Builder: Bureau Brothers Foundry
- Height: 30 feet (9.1 m)
- Beginning date: 1892
- Completion date: 1899
- Dedicated date: April 27, 1899
- Dedicated to: Ulysses S. Grant

The equestrian statue of Ulysses S. Grant is a public monument in Philadelphia, Pennsylvania, United States. Located in Fairmount Park, the monument honors Ulysses S. Grant, who served as a general in the Union Army during the American Civil War and later as President of the United States. The monument was designed by Daniel Chester French and Edward Clark Potter and consists of an equestrian statue atop a pedestal. The statue was dedicated in 1899.

== History ==
=== Background ===
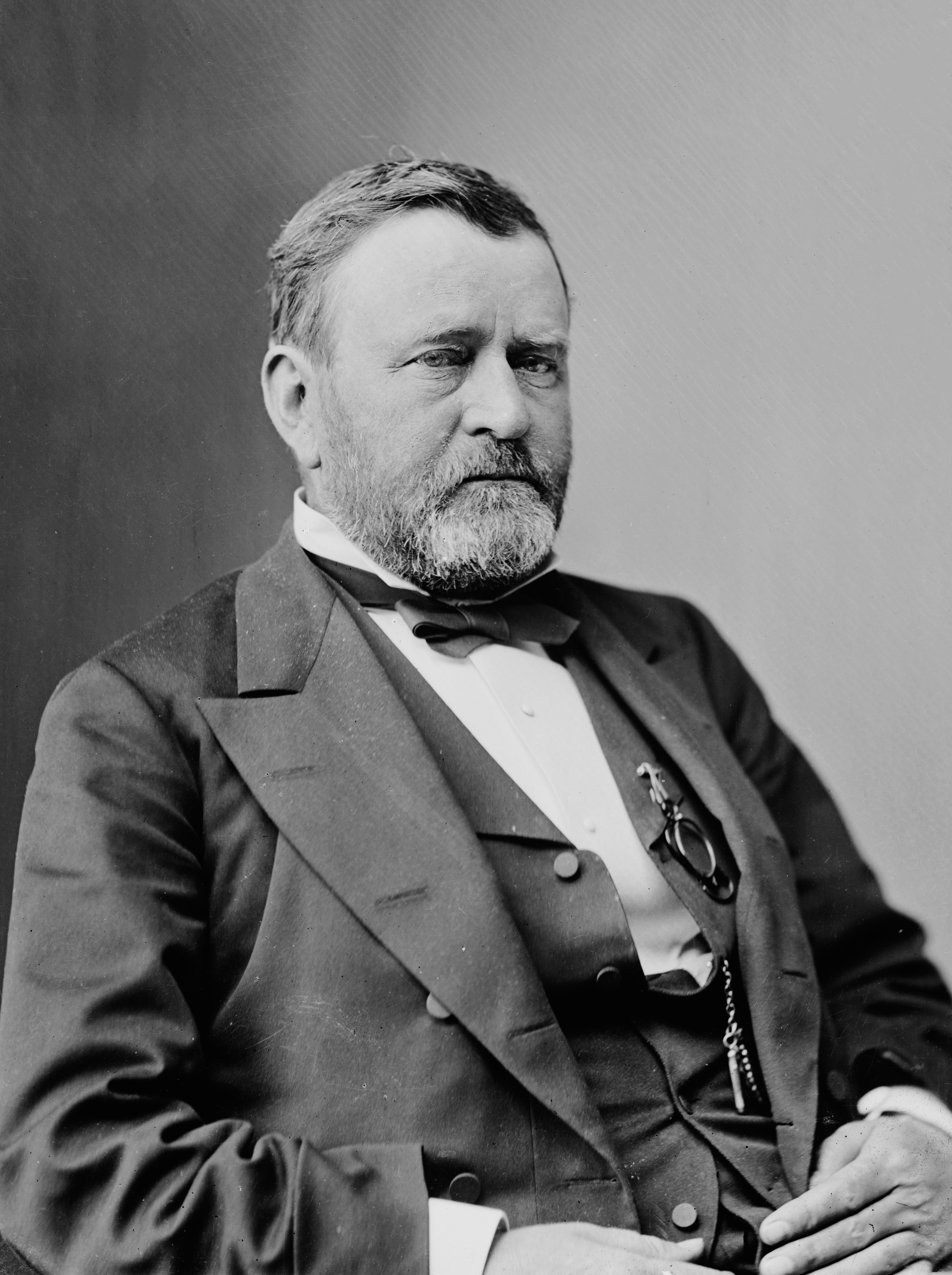
Ulysses S. Grant

The son of Jesse Root Grant and Hannah Simpson Grant, Ulysses S. Grant was born in Point Pleasant, Ohio, United States on April 27, 1822. In spring 1839, at the age of 17, Grant enrolled in the United States Military Academy in West Point, New York, graduating several years later in 1843. Several years later, Grant saw action in the Mexican–American War. At the outbreak of the American Civil War in 1861, Grant, who by this time had pursued a civilian career, returned to military service in the Union Army, where he rose through the ranks as a commander, and in 1864 was promoted to lieutenant general. Grant's military service culminated in Lee's surrender on April 9, 1865, which marked the start of the conclusion of the American Civil War. Following the war, Grant was elected President of the United States in the 1868 United States presidential election, a position he would hold until 1877. Grant died several years after leaving office on July 23, 1885.

=== Creation ===
Following Grant's death, the Fairmount Park Art Association in Philadelphia, Pennsylvania began to fundraise for the creation of a monument honoring Grant in the city's Fairmount Park. By March 1886, the association had raised $12,153.56, which by 1893 had grown to $23,450.50. Additionally, the Philadelphia City Council provided $9,000 in additional funding. Following this, the association accepted proposals from various American sculptors, ultimately selecting Daniel Chester French and Edward Clark Potter to design an equestrian statue of Grant, with French designing the sculpture of Grant and Potter designing the horse. They were officially commissioned on January 23, 1894. The statue was cast by the Bureau Brothers Foundry in Philadelphia, with the statue's pedestal designed by Frank Miles Day & Brother. The total cost for the construction of the monument was $32,675.35.

=== Dedication ===
By Fall 1897, the monument was completed and put in place in Fairmount Park, with tentative plans to unveil the monument on April 27, 1898 (Grant's birthday). However, the sinking of the USS Maine and the subsequent declaration of the Spanish–American War in 1898 caused the dedication ceremony to be delayed. Subsequently, the ceremony was rescheduled to October 27, 1898 (Military Day). However, issues related to an associated military parade caused the ceremony to once more be rescheduled to April 27, 1899. In Fall 1898, President William McKinley was invited to attend the ceremony, which he accepted. Additional invitations were extended to members of the President's cabinet, several military officers, and members of Grant's family. At 2:00 p.m. on the date of the ceremony, a procession was held through the city to Fairmount Park, with President McKinley escorted by the First Troop Philadelphia City Cavalry. In addition to the previously listed guests, the procession included many consuls. At 3:00 p.m., the procession ended and the guests took their places near the monument.

With the guests in place at the monument, the First Battalion, Naval Force of Pennsylvania performed a 21-gun salute for the President. Following this, Philadelphia Mayor Samuel Howell Ashbridge introduced Bishop Ozi William Whitaker of the Episcopal Diocese of Pennsylvania, who gave an invocation for the monument. This prayer was followed by an address by Ashbridge, after which the monument was officially presented to the city by John H. Converse, the president of the Fairmount Park Art Association. As Converse's speech came to a close, Algernon Edward Sartoris and his sister Rosemary Sartoris (grandchildren of Ulysses S. Grant) moved to the top of a large platform next to the monument and removed the bunting that covered the statue. A 17-gun salute was performed by troops at the ceremony, which was followed by another 17-gun salute performed by the USS Raleigh, which was anchored nearby in the Delaware River. An American flag, which had been used by General Nelson A. Miles at his headquarters in Ponce, Puerto Rico, was draped around the pedestal. It had been sent to be used in the ceremony by the National Society, Children of the American Revolution.

Following the statue's unveiling, an additional speech was given and French and Potter were introduced to the crowd, to large applause. Three wreaths were placed on the pedestal, presented by the Military Order of the Loyal Legion of the United States (which Grant had been a member of), Chinese ambassador to the United States Wu Tingfang, and the Society of Daughters of the Revolution. Afterwards, another parade was held with President McKinley and other distinguished guests, which was followed by a celebratory dinner held at the Union League of Philadelphia. The final part of the festivities related to the monument's dedication took place later that night at the Academy of Music, where multiple orations were given regarding Grant and the statue.

== Design ==
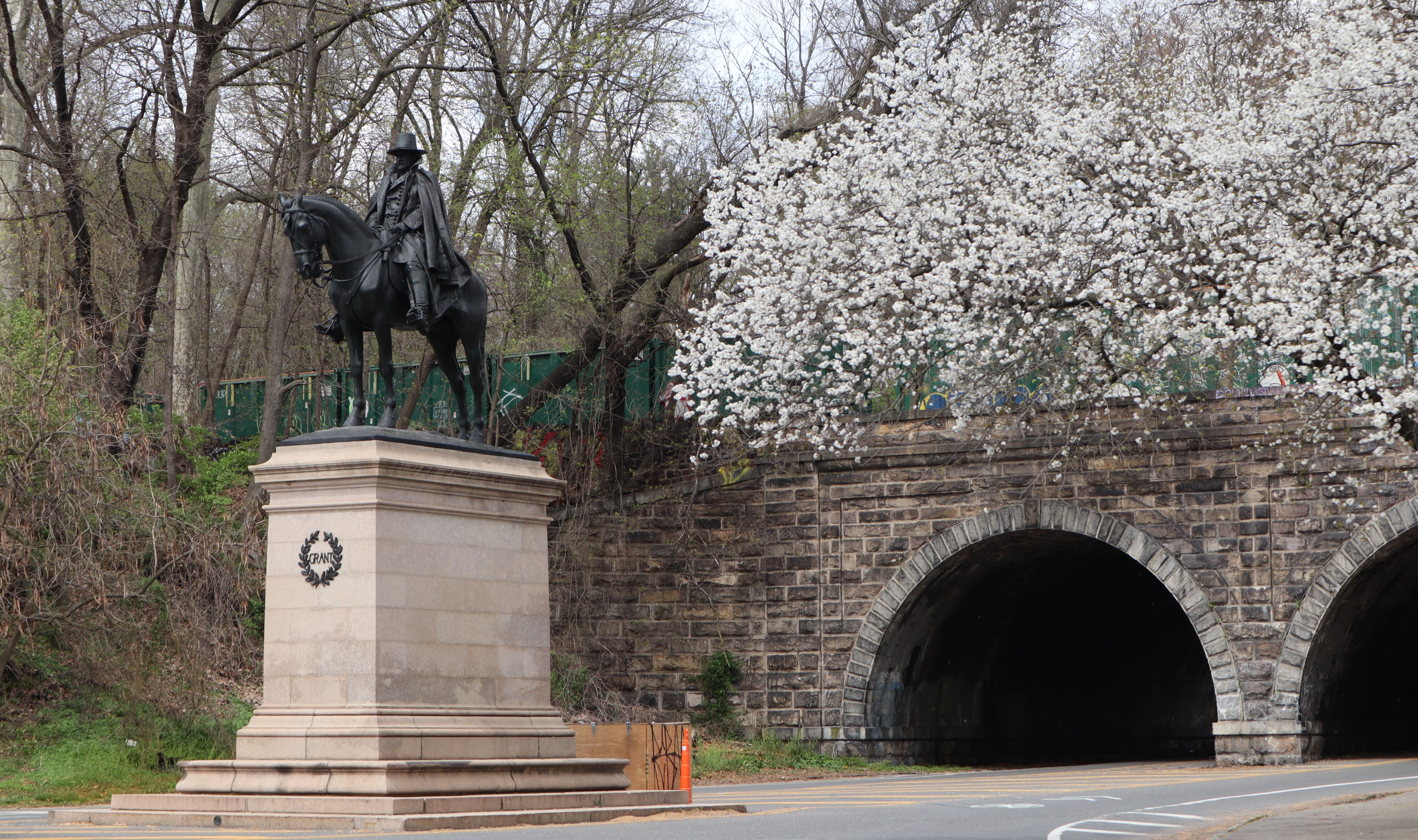
The statue in 2024

According to a publication issued by the Fairmount Park Art Association after the monument's unveiling, the statue depicts a moment when Grant is surveying a battlefield. Ulysses's son Frederick Dent Grant assisted the sculptors in the design of Grant's hat and overcoat. The statue of the horse is modeled after General Grant, a gelding descended from a horse owned by Grant. The statue weighs approximately 10,000 pounds (4,500 kg) and has a height of slightly over 15 feet (4.6 m). The granite pedestal for the statue is a pale pink and also has a height of slightly over 15 feet (4.6 m). The front of the pedestal features a bronze wreath surrounding the word "GRANT".

The monument is located at the intersection of Fountain Green Drive and East Park River Drive inside the park.

== See also ==
- 1899 in art
- List of equestrian statues in the United States
- List of sculptures of presidents of the United States
- List of public art in Philadelphia
- Public sculptures by Daniel Chester French

== Bibliography ==
- Bucchino, Rachel (August 1, 2020). "The U.S. Presidential Election of 1876 Was Pure Chaos. Could 2020 Be the Same?". The National Interest. Archived from the original on November 5, 2020.
- Bunting III, Josiah (2004). Schlesinger Jr., Arthur M. (ed.). Ulysses S. Grant. The American Presidents. Times Books. ISBN 978-0-8050-6949-5 – via Google Books.
- Ceremonies incident to the unveiling of the bronze equestrian statue of general Ulysses S. Grant erected in Fairmount park. Fairmount Park Art Association. J. B. Lippincott & Co. 1899 – via Internet Archive.
- Fleek, Sherman (January 31, 2019). "Grant in Mexico: "One of the most unjust (wars) ever waged"". United States Army. Archived from the original on November 25, 2020.
- Glass, Andrew (July 23, 2016). "Ulysses S. Grant dies, July 23, 1885". Politico. Archived from the original on July 22, 2017.
- Holzer, Harold (2019). Monument Man: The Life and Art of Daniel Chester French. Chronicle Books. ISBN 978-1-61689-829-8 – via Google Books.
- Janney, Caroline E., ed. (2018). Petersburg to Appomattox: The End of the War in Virginia. University of North Carolina Press. ISBN 978-1-4696-4077-8 – via Google Books.
- Waugh, Joan (2009). U. S. Grant: American Hero, American Myth. University of North Carolina Press. ISBN 978-0-8078-9871-0 – via Google Books.
- White, Ronald C. (2016). American Ulysses: A Life of Ulysses S. Grant. Random House. ISBN 978-1-58836-992-5 – via Google Books.
