= Edward Clark Potter =

American sculptor (1857–1923)

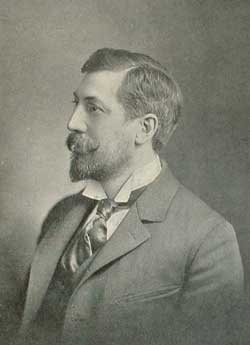
- Photo of Edward Clark Potter in 1899.
- Born: Edward Clark Potter; November 26, 1857; New London, Connecticut
- Died: June 21, 1923 (aged 65); New London, Connecticut
- Education: School of the Museum of Fine Arts, Boston, Académie Julian
- Known for: sculpture

Signature Edward C. Potter

Edward Clark Potter (November 26, 1857 – June 21, 1923) was an American sculptor best known for his equestrian and animal statues. His most famous works are the marble lions, nicknamed Patience and Fortitude, in front of the New York Public Library Main Branch.

== Early years ==
Born in New London, Connecticut, he grew up in Enfield, Massachusetts, where he lived with his mother Mary and sister Clara. There he went to local schools. At 17, due to his mother's wish that he become a minister, he entered Williston Seminary in Easthampton, Massachusetts, for four years. He entered Amherst College in Amherst, Massachusetts, in the class of 1882. He only attended for three semesters, but later was granted an honorary Master's degree. He studied drawing at the School of the Museum of Fine Arts in Boston with Frederic Crowninshield and Otto Grundmann. There he also did some modelling with the sculptor Truman H. Bartlett.

== Career ==
In 1883 he became an assistant to Daniel Chester French and concentrated on animal studies and working as a manager and salesman in the quarries.

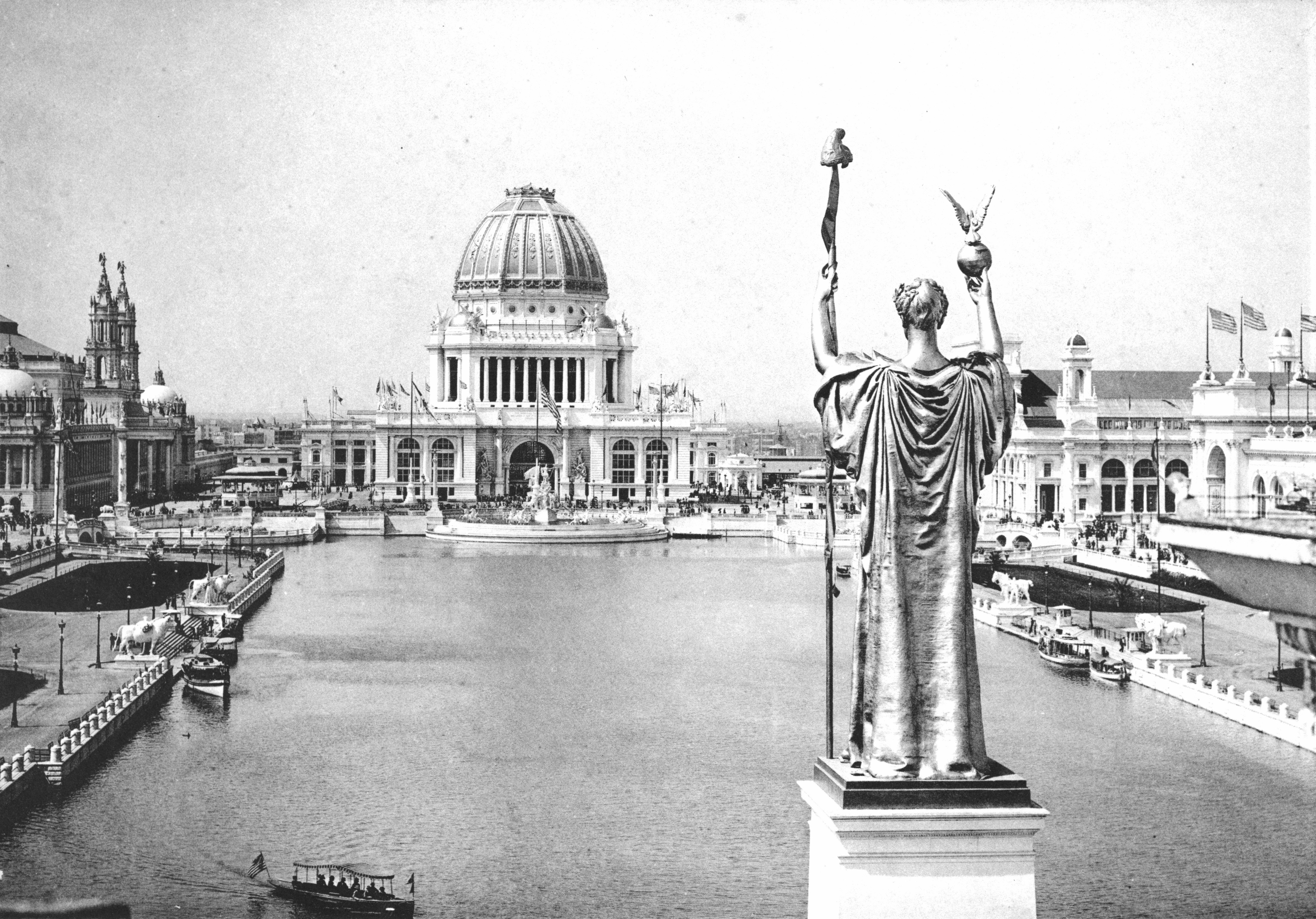
The Republic, World's Columbian Exposition, Chicago, Illinois (1893)

From 1887 to 1889 he studied sculpture at the Académie Julian in Paris with Antonin Mercié and Emmanuel Frémiet, becoming an accomplished animalier (animal sculptor). During his years there, he exhibited several pieces at the Salon: small groups of rabbits, a bust of a black man, a sketch from an American Indian group, and a sleeping faun with a rabbit.

For the 1893 World's Columbian Exposition in Chicago he collaborated with his teacher and friend Daniel Chester French on several of the important sculptures of the exposition. Unfortunately these statues, like most of the architecture of the fair, were made of staff, a temporary material of plaster, cement, and jute fibers, first used in buildings of the Paris exhibition in 1878.

He was elected to the National Sculpture Society in 1893, and joined the Society of American Artists in 1894. This later merged with the National Academy to which he was elected in 1906. Potter won a gold medal at the Louisiana Purchase Exposition in St. Louis in 1904.

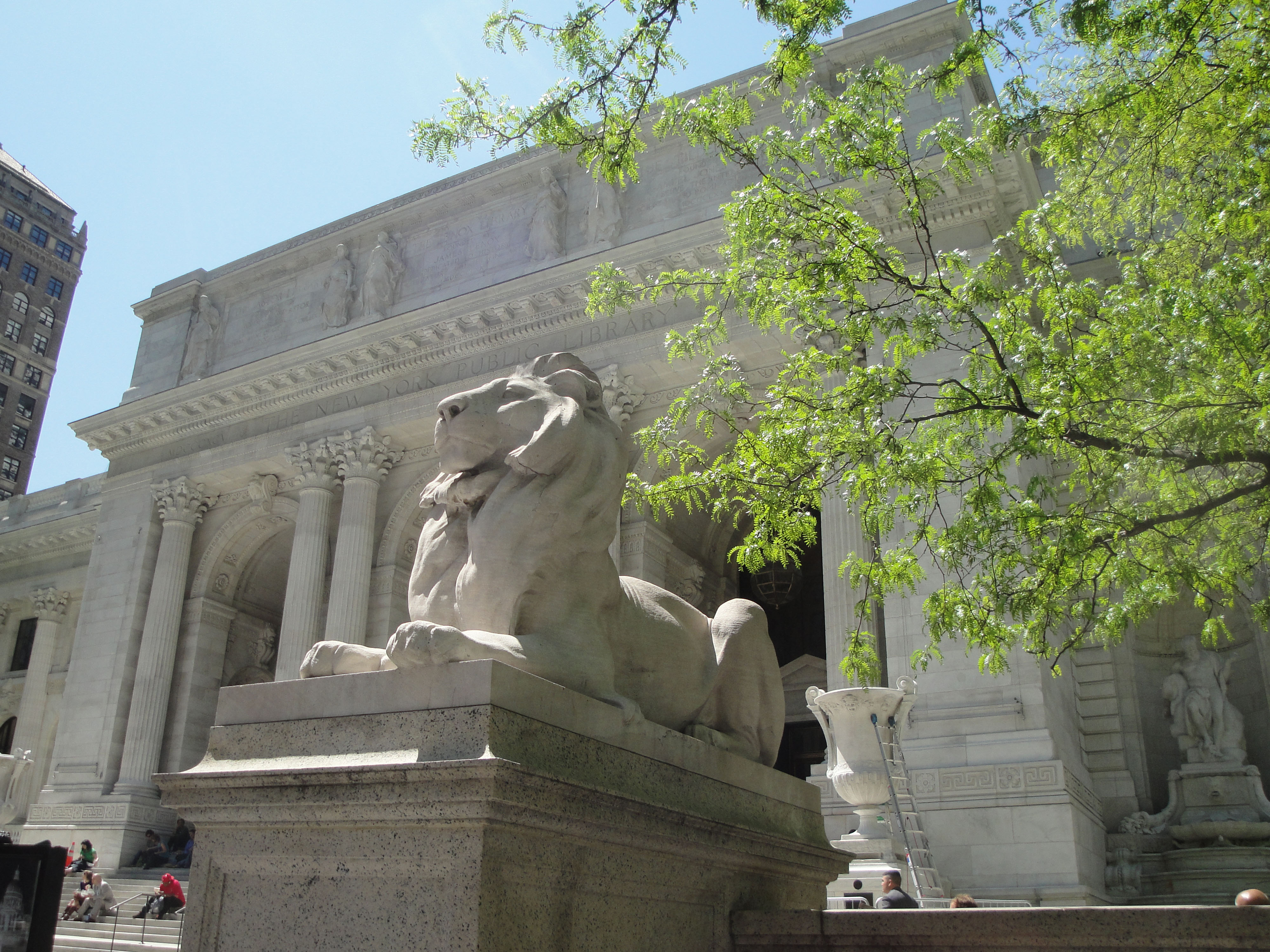
Fortitude Lion, New York Public Library Main Branch (1910-11).

His most famous work is the pair of pink Tennessee marble lions in front of the New York Public Library Main Branch, carved by the Piccirilli brothers. Potter was recommended for this commission by Augustus Saint-Gaudens. The lions were originally nicknamed "Leo Astor" and "Leo Lenox", for the two private libraries that formed the collection's core, but mayor Fiorello La Guardia renamed them for qualities New Yorkers were showing in weathering the Great Depression—Patience (on the left or south) and Fortitude (on the right or north)—and those names have stuck.

A resident of Greenwich, Connecticut, after 1902, he sculpted the memorial to Raynal Bolling there in 1922. The Cos Cob section of Greenwich is considered one of the birthplaces of American Impressionism. Potter was a founder and first president of the Greenwich Society of Artists, founded in 1912.

He died at his summer home in New London, Connecticut.

== Collaborations with Daniel Chester French ==
=== World's Columbian Exposition, Chicago, 1893 ===
(These were temporary sculptures, all were destroyed.)

- Grand Court
- The Republic (replicated as Statue of The Republic)
- Statue of Industry
- Statue of Plenty
- Statue of The Teamster
- Columbus Quadriga (horse-drawn chariot)
- Quadriga outriders

=== Equestrian statues ===
- Equestrian statue of Lieutenant General Ulysses S. Grant, Fairmount Park, Philadelphia, Pennsylvania (1893–98)
- Equestrian statue of George Washington, Place d'Iéna, Paris, France (1900)
- Equestrian statue of George Washington, Washington Park, Chicago, Illinois (1900–1904). This is a replica of the statue in Paris.
- Equestrian statue of Major General Joseph Hooker, Massachusetts Statehouse, Boston, Massachusetts (1903)
- Progress of the State quadriga, Minnesota State Capitol, Cass Gilbert, architect, St. Paul, Minnesota (1905–1907)
- Equestrian statue of Charles Devens, Worcester, Massachusetts (1906)
- Equestrian statue of a bugler, "Soldier's Monument" Brookline, MA, (1915)

== Gallery ==
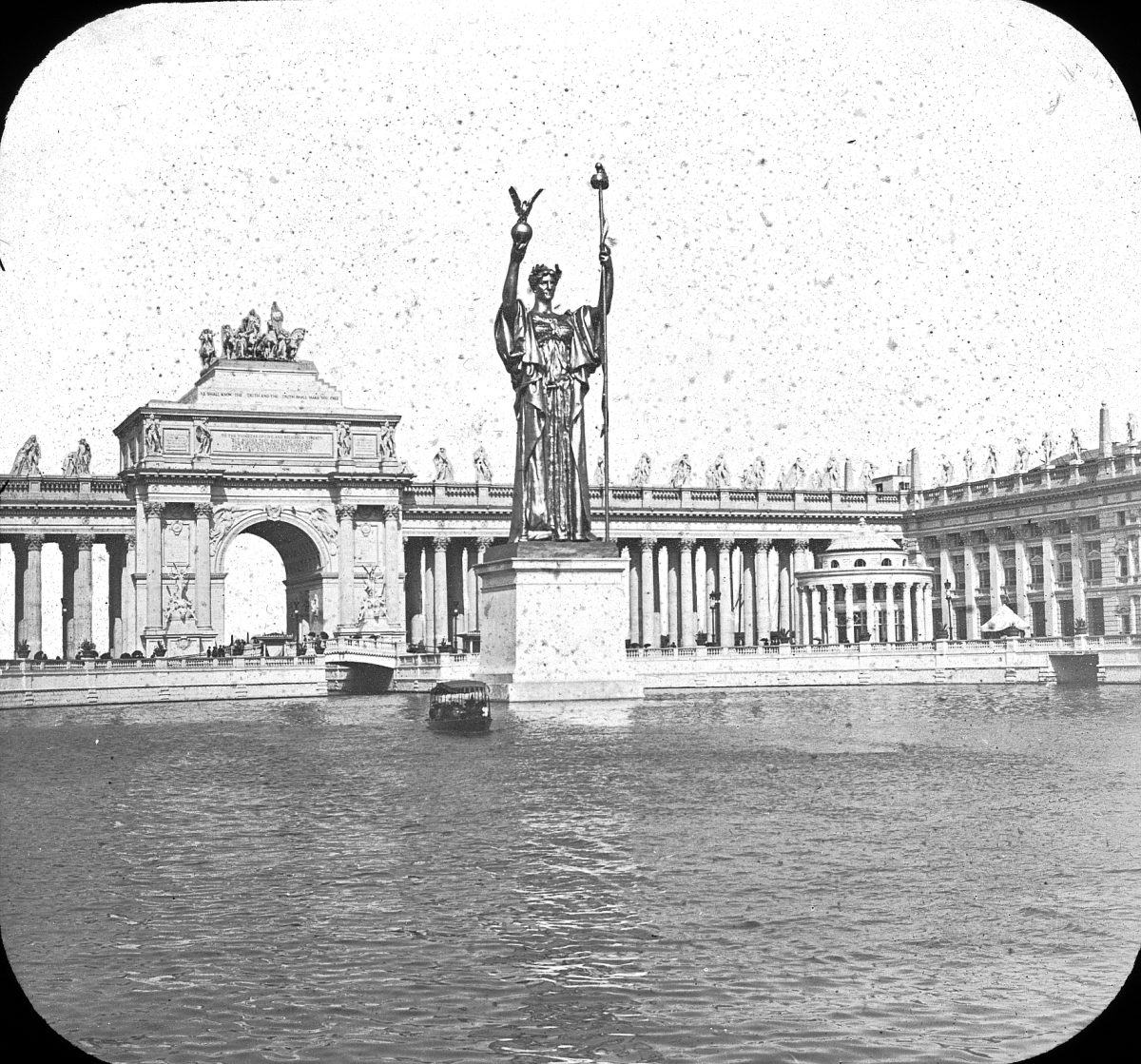
World's Columbian Exposition, Chicago (1893). Potter's Quadriga (horse-drawn chariot) is atop the pavilion behind The Republic

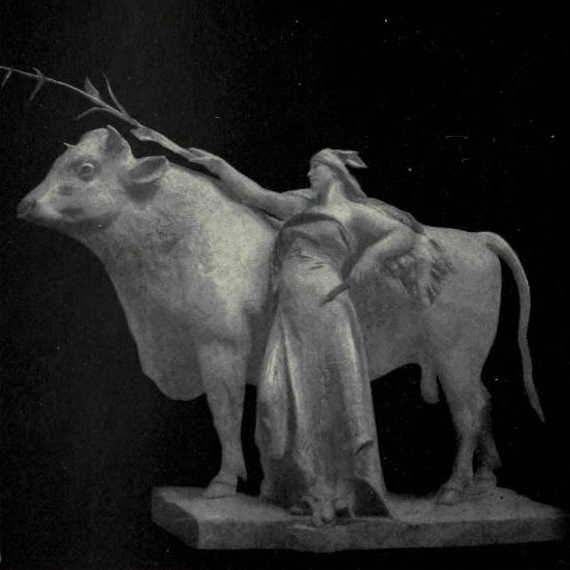
Indian Corn
(Woman by Daniel Chester French)

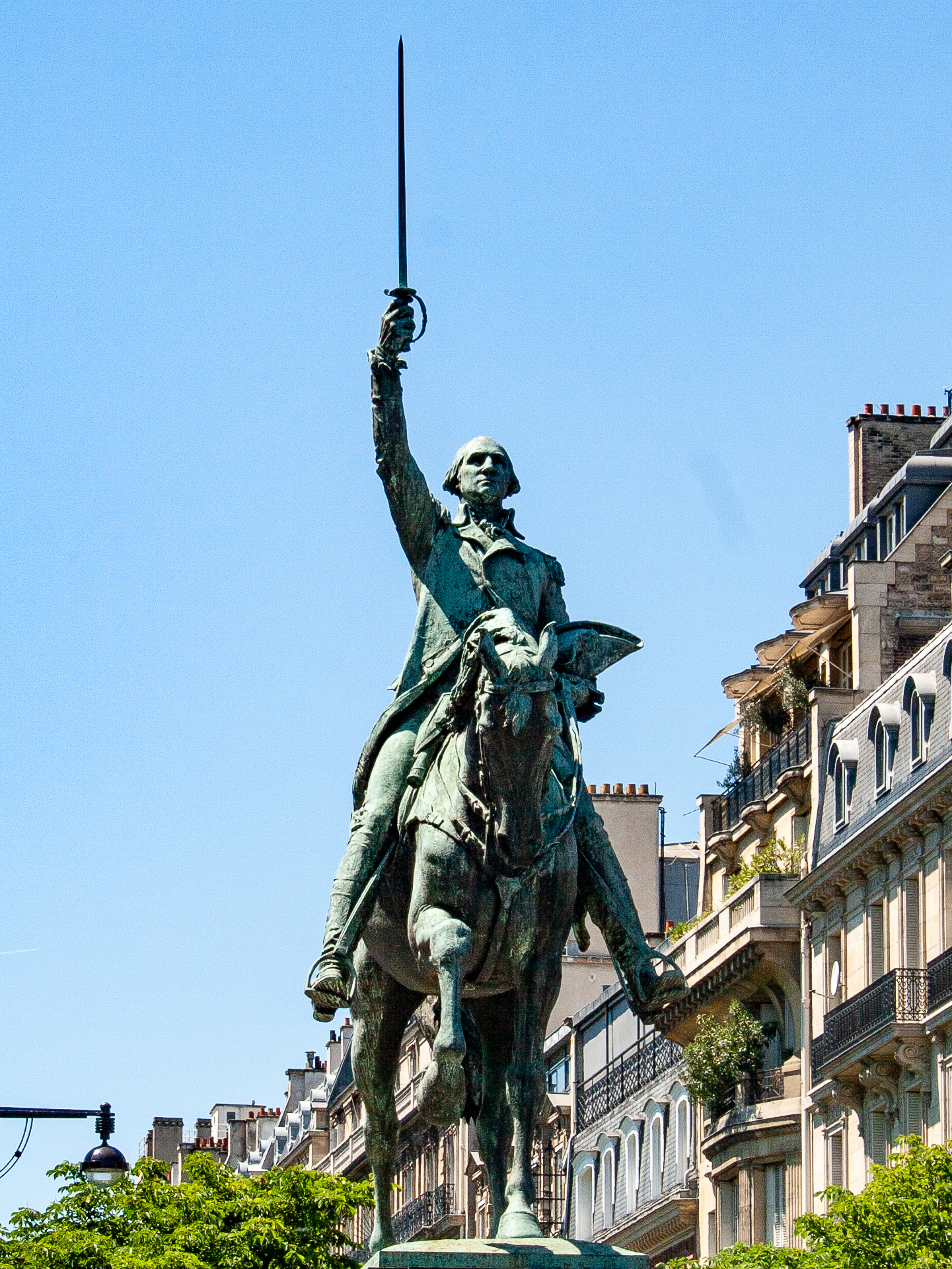
Equestrian statue of George Washington, Place d'Iéna, Paris, France (1900)

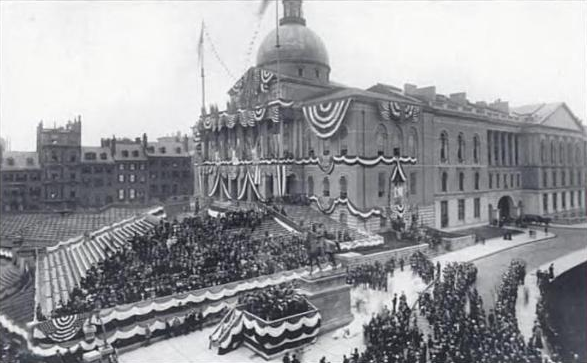
Dedication of the General Joseph Hooker statue, Massachusetts Statehouse, Boston, MA (1903)

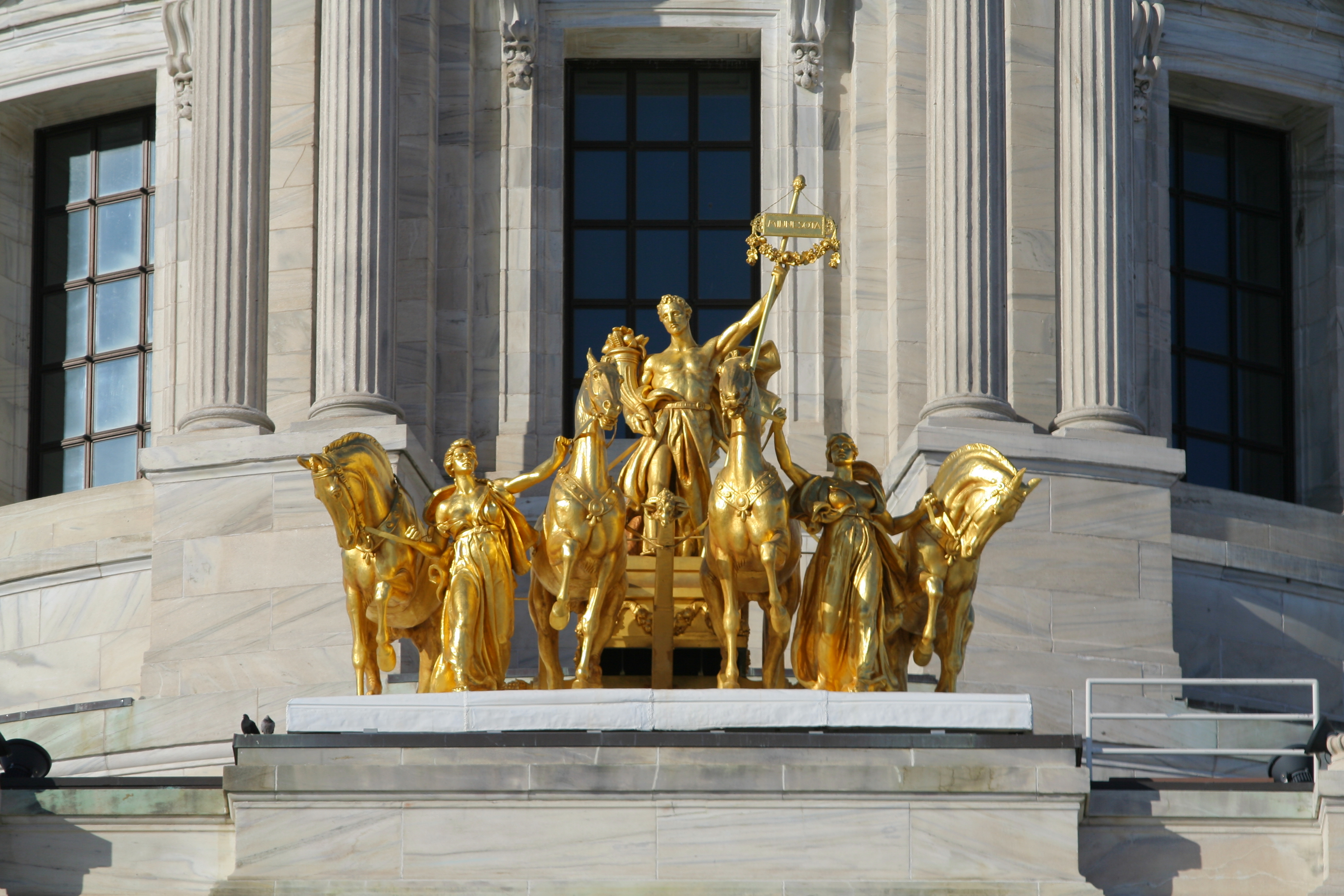
Progress of the State Quadriga, Minnesota State Capitol, St. Paul, Minnesota (1905–1907)

== Selected works ==
- Sleeping Faun, Metropolitan Museum of Art, New York City (1887–89).
- Bust of Vice President William A. Wheeler, U.S. Capitol, Washington, DC (1890–1892).
- Austin Blair, Michigan State Capitol, Lansing, Michigan (1895–1898).
- Robert Fulton, Rotunda Reading Room, Library of Congress, Washington, DC (1897). One of 16 bronze statues set around the third-floor balustrade.
- John Paul Jones, Dewey Triumphal Arch, Madison Square, New York City (1899, destroyed).
- Equestrian Statue of Major General Henry W. Slocum, Gettysburg Battlefield, Gettysburg, Pennsylvania (1902).
- Equestrian Statue of Major General Charles Devens, Worcester County Courthouse, Worcester, Massachusetts (1905–06).
- Indian Religion (Buddha), Brooklyn Museum, Brooklyn, New York (1907–1909).
- Indian Philosophy (Sankara), Brooklyn Museum, Brooklyn, New York (1907–1909).
- Sighting the Enemy (George Armstrong Custer Equestrian Monument), Monroe, Michigan (1908–1910).
- Equestrian Statue of Major General George B. McClellan, Smith Memorial Arch, Philadelphia, Pennsylvania (1909–1911).
- Lions, New York Public Library Main Branch, New York City (1910–11).
- Equestrian Statue of Major General Philip Kearny, Arlington National Cemetery, Arlington, Virginia (1912–1914).
- Bust of Sidney Lanier on the Sidney Lanier Monument, Piedmont Park, Atlanta, Georgia (1914).
- The Bugler (Brookline Civil War Monument), Brookline, Massachusetts (1915).
- Equestrian Statue of Major General John A. McClernand, Vicksburg, Mississippi (1919).
- Raynal Bolling Memorial, Greenwich, Connecticut (1922).
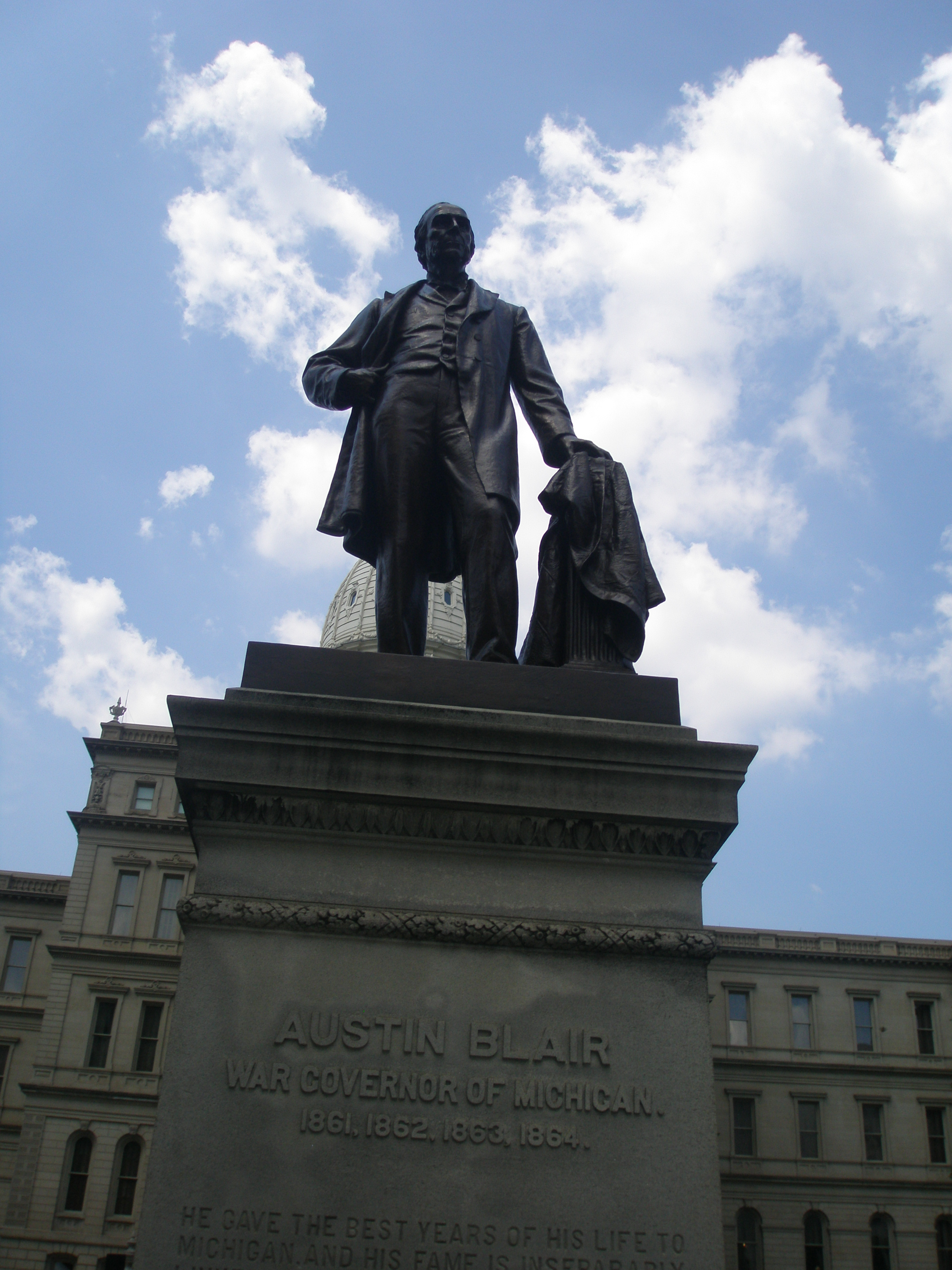
Austin Blair, Michigan State Capitol, Lansing, Michigan (1895–1898).

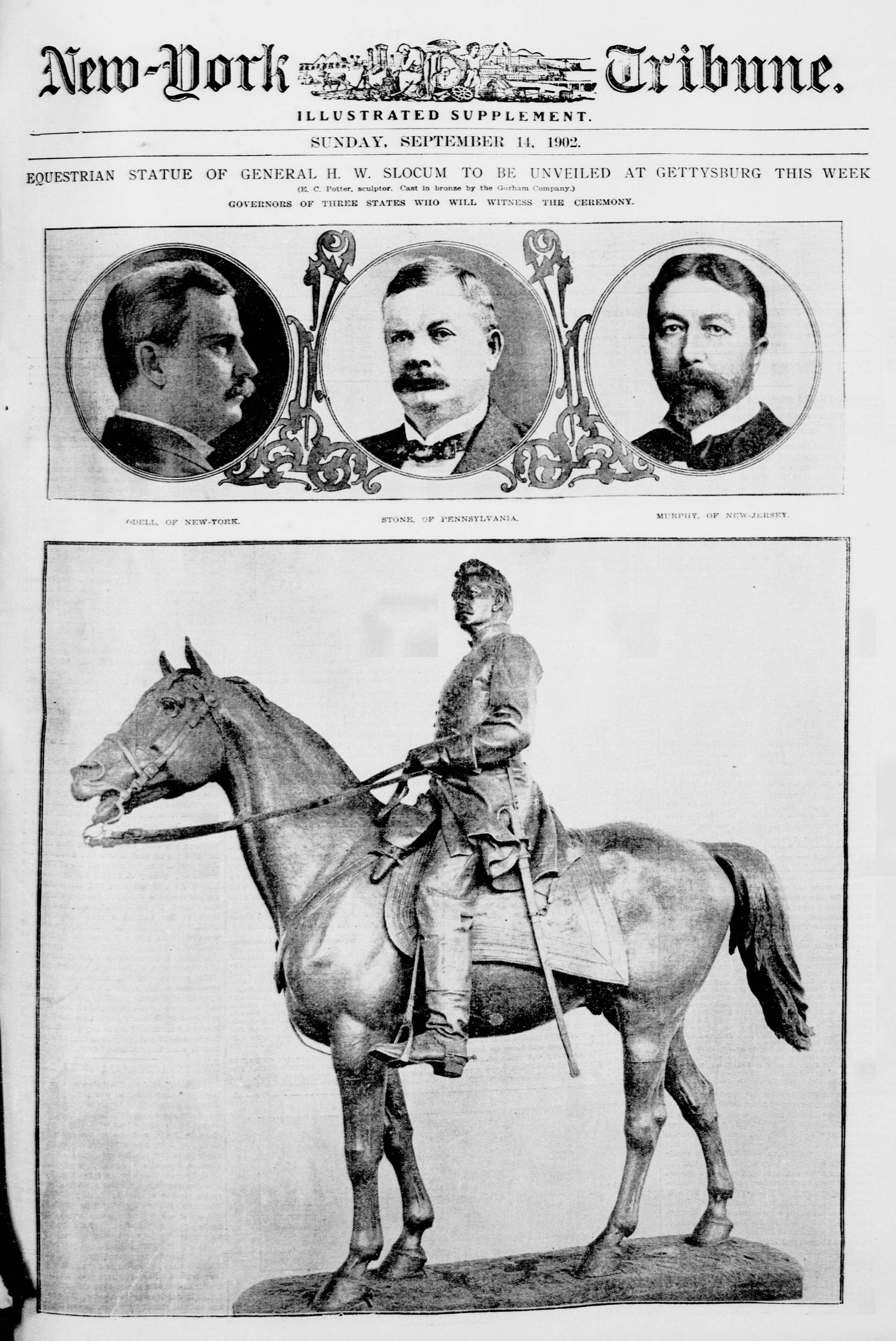
General H. W. Slocum, Gettysburg, Pennsylvania (1920)

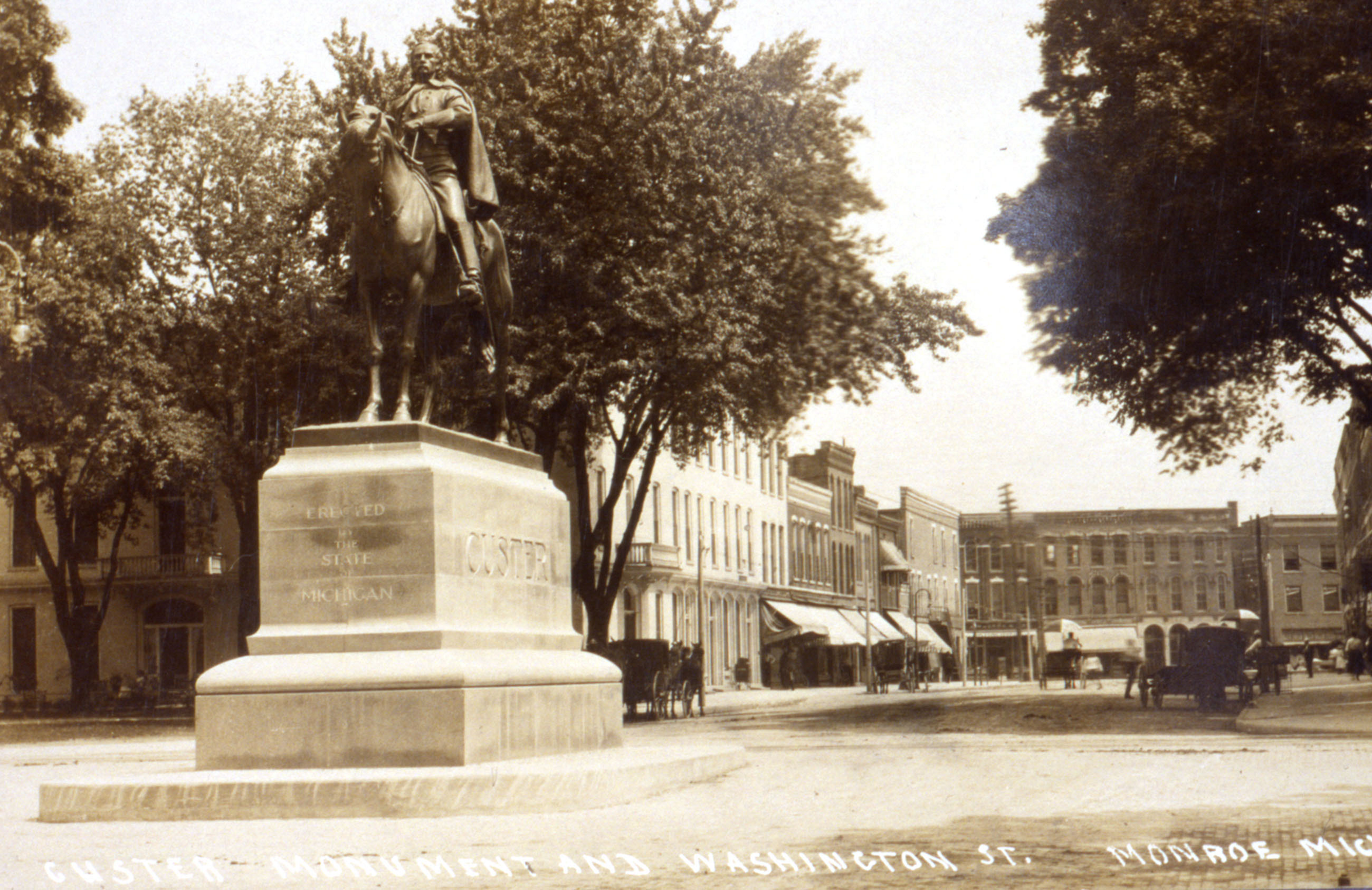
George Armstrong Custer Equestrian Monument, Monroe, Michigan (1908–1910).

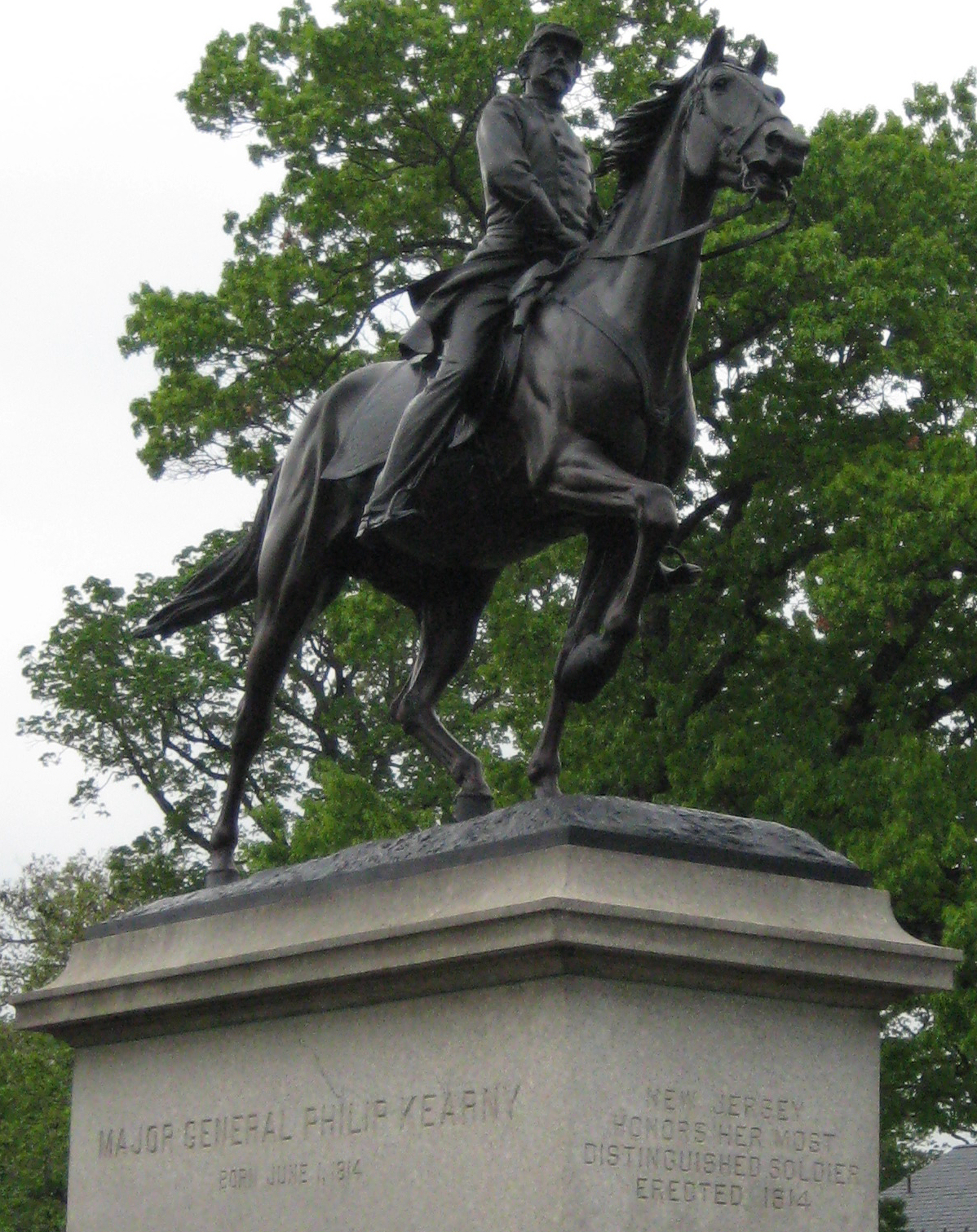
Major General Philip Kearny, Arlington National Cemetery, Arlington, Virginia (1912–1914).

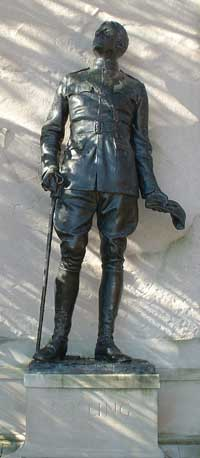
Raynal Bolling Memorial, Greenwich, Connecticut (1922).
