= List of memorials to the Grand Army of the Republic =

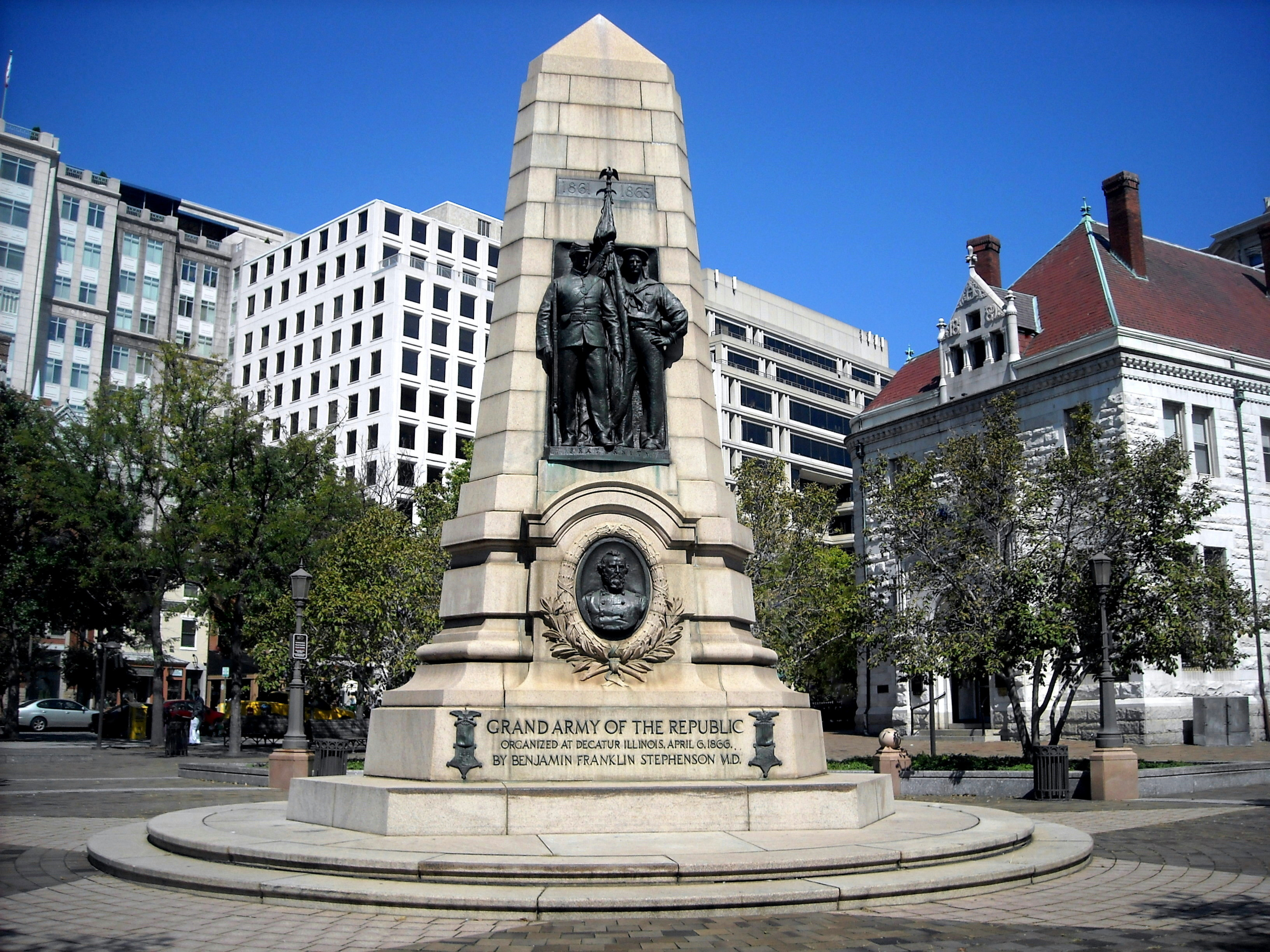
The Stephenson Grand Army of the Republic Memorial in Washington, D.C.

See also List of Union Civil War monuments and memorials

This is a list of memorials to the Grand Army of the Republic. Memorials include a commemorative postage stamp, a U.S. highway, and physical memorials in numerous communities throughout the United States:

== National ==
- U.S. Route 6 is known as the Grand Army of the Republic Highway for its entire length.
- At the final encampment in 1949, the Post Office Department issued a three-cent commemorative postage stamp. Two years later, it printed a virtually identical stamp for the final reunion of the United Confederate Veterans.

== State ==
=== Alabama ===
- Birmingham: GAR plot and memorial dedicated in 1891 in Oak Hill Cemetery

=== Arizona ===
- Tombstone: A monument in the memory of the Comrades of the GAR, dedicated May 30, 1887, stands in the Tombstone Cemetery.

=== California ===
- Modesto: Memorial lot in Modesto Pioneer Cemetery contains 36 graves, a wooden cenotaph and two cannons were erected as a monument in 1907. The wooden cenotaph was replaced with a granite obelisk in 1924.
- Oakland: GAR plot and monument dedicated in 1893 in Mountain View Cemetery, 5000 Piedmont Avenue.
- Sacramento: GAR memorial and many grave sites in the Sacramento Historic City Cemetery (aka Old City Cemetery).

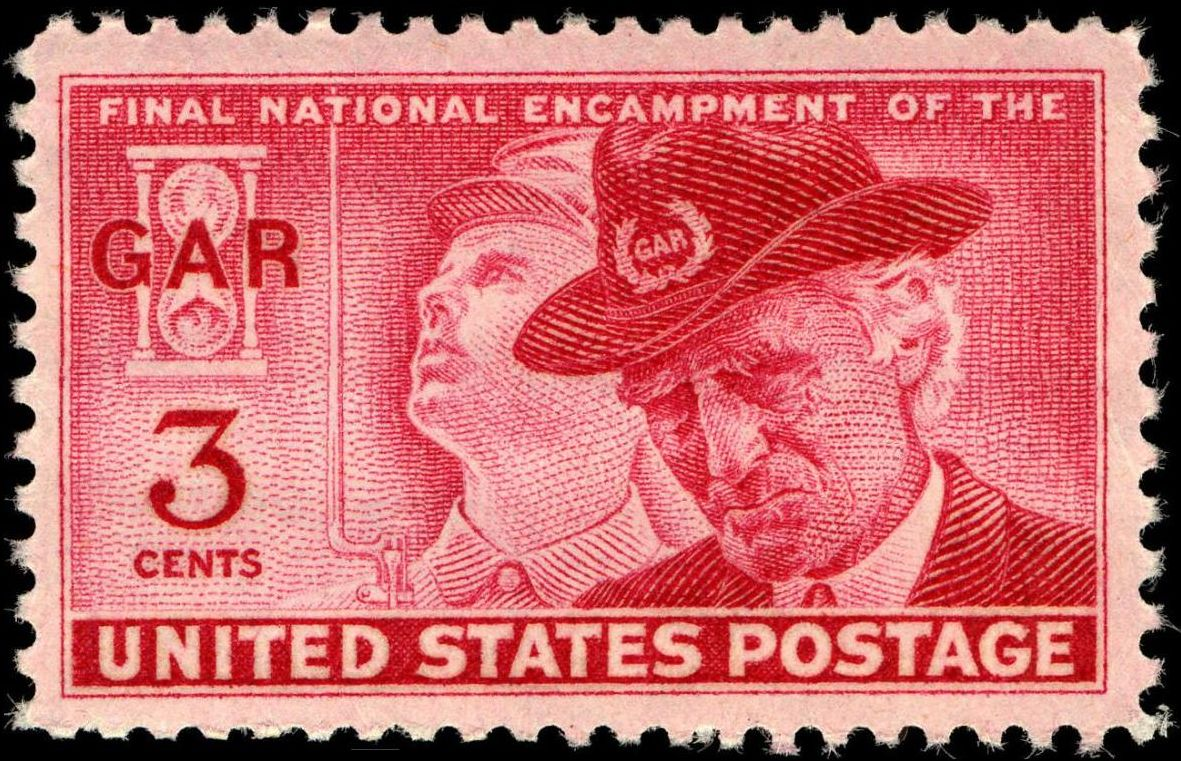
G.A.R. Commemorative issue of 1948

- San Jose: GAR lot in Oak Hill Cemetery.
- San Diego: Monument in memory to the GAR in Mount Hope Cemetery. Dedicated by the Woman's Relief Corp.

=== Connecticut ===
- Rockville: The New England Civil War Museum is maintained by Alden Skinner Camp 45 Sons of Union Veterans of the Civil War. The museum is within Memorial Hall, which was dedicated to the GAR veterans by the former city of Rockville.

=== District of Columbia ===
- Washington: A memorial honoring founder Benjamin F. Stephenson, M.D., stands near the National Archives Building and the Navy Memorial (38.893565°N 77.021558°W). The GAR Memorial Foundation erected the monument using funds appropriated by the U.S. Congress in 1907 and dedicated the work in 1909.

=== Idaho ===
- Boise
  - The Hall of the Sheridan Post located at 714 W. State Street was added to the National Register of Historic Places in 1974 and currently houses the James A. & Louise McClure Center for Public Policy Research of the University of Idaho.
  - The Ladies of the GAR erected a granite monument on the northwest corner of the Capitol Building grounds in April 1935.

=== Illinois ===
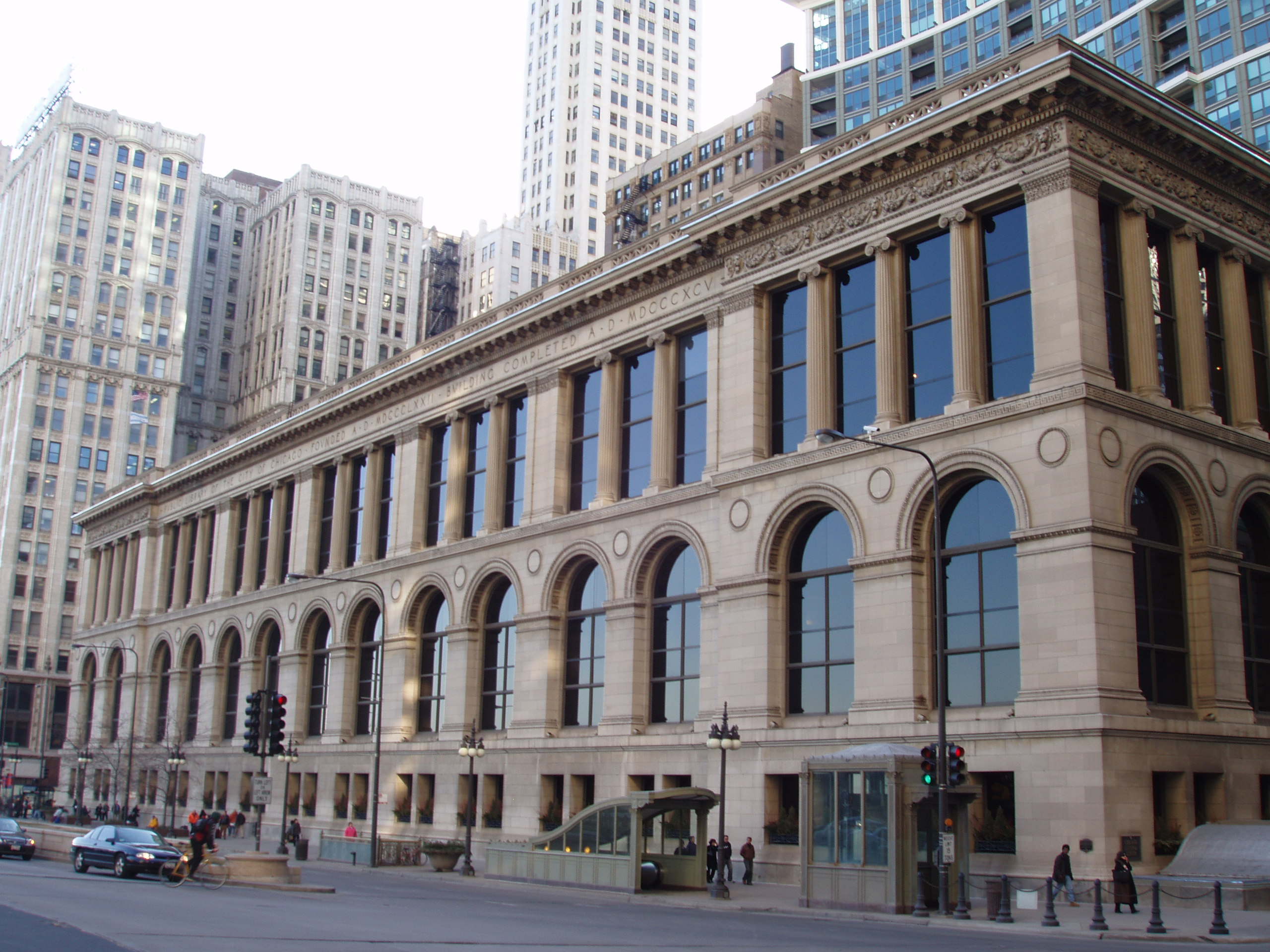
The Chicago Cultural Center (1893), built on land donated by the GAR, maintains a memorial hall to the Grand Army

- Aurora
  - Grand Army of the Republic Hall (Aurora, Illinois) Built in 1878 as a memorial to the Union soldiers. G.A.R. Post No. 20 met here until the 1930s, when the last member died. Operates as a military history museum after several restoration attempts.
- Chicago
  - GAR memorial and several gravesites in Union Ridge Cemetery in the Norwood Park neighborhood.
  - The current Chicago Cultural Center was formerly the dual-purposed Chicago Public Library and GAR Meeting Hall. Completed in 1897, it occupies property on Michigan Avenue at Randolph Street donated by the GAR.
  - GAR memorial and approximately 350 graves in Rosehill Cemetery
  - Memorial to German soldiers of the Civil War in St. Boniface Cemetery. Almost a quarter million German Americans fought for the Union, the largest of any ethnic group in the country.

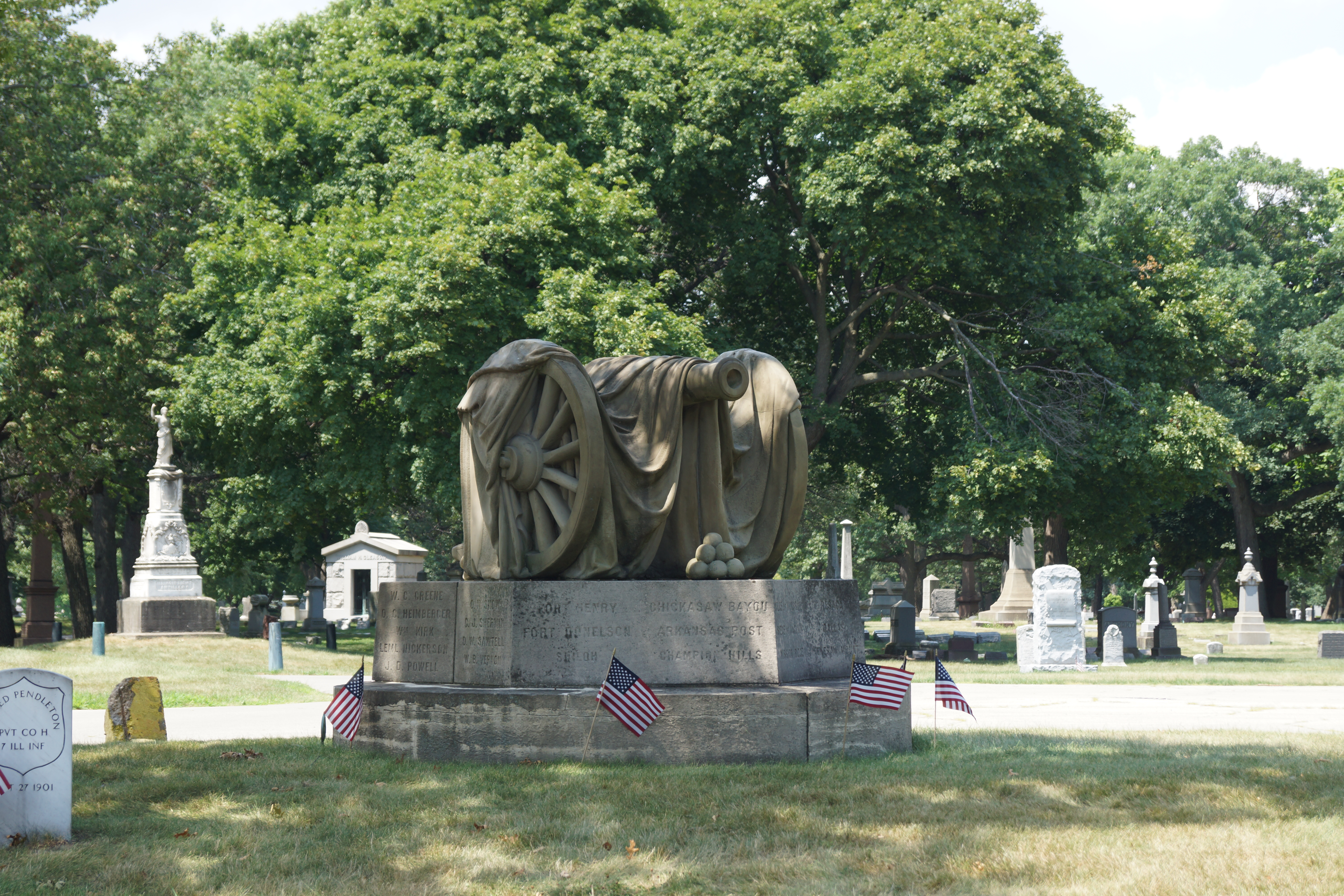
Battery A Chicago Light Artillery Monument in Rosehill Cemetery

- Decatur: GAR section with approximately 570 graves and monument in Greenwood Cemetery
- Hoopeston: Floral Hill Cemetery holds a GAR memorial and many gravesites.
- Minier: A GAR monument erected in 1888 by the John Hunter GAR Post 168.
- Murphysboro: A cemetery with the graves of several GAR members who were former slaves originally from Tennessee is southwest of the town.
- Palatine Township: re-dedicated the Grand Army Memorial Plot at Hillside Cemetery on August 16, 2015.
- River Forest: Grand Army of the Republic Memorial Woods which is part of the Forest Preserves of Cook County.
- Springfield:
  - Grand Army of the Republic Memorial Museum, located at 629 South 7th Street, is owned and maintained by the Woman's Relief Corps Auxiliary to the Grand Army of the Republic.
  - The Daughters of Union Veterans of the Civil War donated a sundial that was dedicated on the grounds of the Illinois State Capitol September 8, 1940, during the 74th Encampment of the GAR.
- Watseka: GAR Cemetery, established for the Williams Post 25, has a memorial and statue as prominent features at the entrance.

=== Indiana ===
- Valparaiso: The Memorial Opera House was constructed by the local GAR chapter in 1893.

=== Iowa ===
- Des Moines: In 1922, a banner created for the GAR encampment was declared a permanent memorial and suspended in the rotunda of the Iowa State Capitol. A sundial was dedicated to the GAR on grounds of the Iowa State Capitol during the 1938 encampment.
- Eldora: GAR memorial of a metal soldier atop a granite base costing $3,000 was erected in 1885 in the center of the town square. It was relocated on the site in 1890 to accommodate construction of the courthouse. It has since been relocated to a site east of the courthouse and restored in 1985.
- Red Oak: GAR memorial of a bronze soldier atop a granite base was dedicated in 1907 near grave sites in Evergreen Cemetery.
- Mt. Pleasant: Hickory Grove Cemetery, at the junction of Hwy 218 & 185th Street, holds a GAR monument and grave sites.
- Redfield: The Marshall GAR Hall was restored in 2008 and houses a small museum.
- Waterloo: The Grand Army of the Republic meeting hall has been restored and is operated as a meeting hall and museum by the City of Waterloo. It was added to the National Register of Historic Places in 1988.

=== Kansas ===
- Baxter Springs: GAR monument and 163 gravesites in the Baxter Springs City Cemetery
- Topeka: The GAR Memorial Hall at 120 SW 10th Avenue was dedicated May 27, 1914, housed the Kansas State Historical Society until 1995 when the society moved to larger quarters. After restoration, the structure became home to the Attorney General and Secretary of State offices in 2000.
- Westmoreland: GAR Monument located in center of Westmoreland City Cemetery located in Pottawatomie County Kansas. Westmoreland.

=== Kentucky ===
- Covington: GAR Monument in the Linden Grove Cemetery was erected in 1929.
- Frankfort: The Colored Soldiers Monument occupies a site in Green Hill Cemetery near the junction of US 60 and US 421.

=== Louisiana ===
- Chalmette: Chalmette National Cemetery in Jean Lafitte National Historical Park and Preserve contains a monument and the graves of approximately 12,000 Union Soldiers from the Civil War

=== Maryland ===
- Baltimore
  - A sundial at Warren Avenue and Henry Street in the Federal Hill neighborhood was dedicated in 1933.
  - Multiple Union veterans monuments are located in Loudon Park National Cemetery on Frederick Road in Irvington.
- Winfield: A monument to Pickett Post, G.A.R. in Ebenezer United Methodist Church Cemetery, on Woodbine Road.
- Hagerstown:
  - Memorial Speaker's Rostrum dedicated to the MG Jesse L. Reno Post, #4 of Hagerstown in 1924 is located in Rose Hill Cemetery
  - Monument dedicated to Lyon Post #31 of Hagerstown (an African-American post), constructed in 2013. Located adjacent to the Reno Post Memorial in Rose Hill Cemetery.
- Lansdowne: Memorial Church dedicated to the memory of the Grand Army of the Republic.

=== Massachusetts ===
- Lynn: Grand Army of the Republic Hall and Museum
- Rockland: Hartstuff Post 74 was dedicated January 30, 1900. Portions of the wooden structure were restored between 1990 and 1999 and the structure is currently home of the Sons of Union Veterans of the Civil War Camp 50.

=== Michigan ===
- Algonac: Bronze statue of a soldier on a granite base was erected in 1905 in Boardwalk Park on St. Clair River Drive.
- Bay City:
  - A monument of Whitney granite on a base of the same was erected in 1893 in Pine Ridge Cemetery in a section dedicated as Soldier's Rest. Pine Ridge Cemetery is located on the SE corner of Tuscola and Ridge Rd
  - In 1902, an 8-inch Howitzer siege gun cannon was added to the Soldier's Rest section of Pine Ridge to guard the soldiers.
- Detroit: Grand Army of the Republic Building was completed in 1890 as a meeting place for the local chapter of the GAR. When membership dwindled in the 1930s, the group deeded the property to the City of Detroit who paid a portion of the construction costs. The building was listed on the National Register of Historic Places in 1986 and was vacant for many years. In November 2011, the software company Mindfield acquired the building and, through the summer of 2013, spent over $1,000,000 on restoration. In addition to Mindfield, the building now houses an upscale restaurant.
- Flint: Two Parrott rifles occupy the lawn of the Genesee County Courthouse. In 2003, the Governor Henry H. Crapo Camp of SUVCW restored the bases and held a re-dedication ceremony.
- Grand Rapids
  - A zinc fountain depicting a soldier at parade rest atop a carved column was dedicated in 1885 at the intersection of Fulton, Monroe and Division in what is now called Veterans Memorial Park. It was restored and rededicated in October 2003.
  - In Memory of Grand Army of Republic Marker is also located in Veterans Memorial Park.
  - Oak Hill Cemetery at 1100 Eastern Avenue, SE contains an obelisk and the graves of several members of the Custer Post No. 5.
- Lansing
  - Stone memorial dedicated to GAR by the Department of Michigan Woman's Relief Corps. on June 11, 1924.

=== Minnesota ===
- Bemidji: GAR memorial in Greenwood Cemetery.

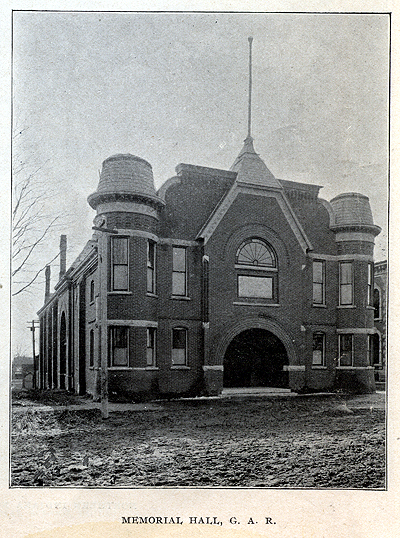
Grand Army of the Republic Memorial Opera House, Valparaiso, Indiana. c. 1898

- Detroit Lakes: GAR Park at 317 Washington Avenue opened May 30, 1952, on the site of the former meeting hall. The park was renovated and rededicated on April 15, 2015.
- Grand Meadow: GAR Hall/Museum. Booth Post No. 130 was once a meeting hall for members of the Grand Army of the Republic. The hall is believed to be one of only two remaining in Minnesota and is located on South Main Street between First Avenue SW and Second Avenue SW. The building is on the National Register of Historic Places because of its architectural and social significance.
- Hastings: Peller Post 89 purchased one-half acre of land for a cemetery in 1905. It holds graves of Civil War and Spanish–American War veterans. In 1998, local VFW post 1210 restored the cemetery.
- Litchfield: The hall of Frank Daggett Post 35 has been preserved and houses a GAR museum. The Ripley Cemetery houses a "Soldiers and Sailors Monument" that was dedicated on May 31, 1909, and renovated in 2007.
- St. Paul: A memorial obelisk capped by a bronze statue stands at the intersection of John Ireland Boulevard and Summit Avenue. The statue gazes toward the capitol building to the east and was erected in 1903 at a cost of $9,000. It was created by artist John K. Daniels and bears a dedication to "Josias R. King the first man to volunteer in the 1st MN infantry" and commemorates all who fought.
- White Bear Lake GAR monument is located at 2nd St & Clark Ave. It was dedicated May 30, 1913. A white bronze statue was selected, and the base was designed to list the names of the members of the E.B. Gibbs Post, along with the battles in which they fought. Around the base of the monument are the names of major Civil War battles. The monument faces north.

=== Missouri ===
- Carthage: Park Cemetery contains a lot with several burials from the Stanton Post No. 16 with a large granite monument
- Laclede: Grove and Cole Streets; Bronze soldier atop a granite base inscribed with a dedication to the Phil Kearny Post No. 19
- Monett: Oakdale Cemetery, formally, Westbay Cemetery has a large G.A.R. monument.

=== Nebraska ===
- Omaha: Forest Lawn Memorial Park holds a GAR memorial and many grave sites.

=== New Hampshire ===
- Peterborough: GAR Memorial Hall on Grove Street.
- South Lyndeborough: The Hartshorn Memorial Cannon was named and dedicated by the Harvey Holt Post, Grand Army of the Republic, in 1902. The cannon was previously located outside the GAR's headquarters, Citizens' Hall, before being moved to the village common in 1934.
- Franklin: A GAR Hall occupies space on the second floor of Franklin City Hall.

=== New Jersey ===
- Asbury Park: Monument at Grand and Cookman Avenues erected by C.K. Hall Post 41.
- Atlantic City: Monument at Providence and Capt. O'Donnell Parkway erected by the Joe Hooker Post 32.
- Camden: Plot of the William B. Hatch Post 37 with monument in Evergreen Cemetery.
- Egg Harbor: General Stahel Post 62 plot in the Egg Harbor City Cemetery.
- Jersey City:
  - Bayview – New York Bay Cemetery — Monument and plot of Van Houten Post #3 and Ladies Relief Post #16, 44 graves including William Winterbottom, Medal of Honor recipient.
  - Soldiers and Sailors Monument, Goddess of Victory bronze by Philip Martiny, at City Hall, 280 Grove Street
- Manchester Township: Monument at Oakdale Street and Wellington Avenue consisting of a small peristyle, flagpole and two cannons.
- Port Norris: GAR Cemetery of the John Shinn Post 6.
- Washington: Members donated inscribed windows commemorating the John F. Reynolds GAR Post 66 to the construction of the First Methodist Episcopal Church (now The United Methodist Church in Washington) in 1896.

=== New York ===
- Bath
  - 40-foot high granite Preservation of the Union Monument (1892), in Bath National Cemetery.
  - Memorial in Nondaga Cemetery, erected by Custer Post 81 in 1916 in observance of Memorial Day.
- Buffalo: Soldiers and Sailors Monument dedicated in Lafayette Square in 1884. By 1889, the monument began to list and was reconstructed.
- New York City:
  - Grand Army Plaza in Brooklyn was dedicated in 1926 and forms the entrance to Prospect Park. It contains a triumphal arch and other monuments.
  - In Midtown Manhattan, Grand Army Plaza contains a statue of General Sherman.
  - In Upper Manhattan, the west flagpole on Low Plaza at the entrance of Low Memorial Library on Columbia University's Morningside Heights campus was donated by the Lafayette Post of the Grand Army of the Republic in 1898 and bears the inscription "Love, Cherish, Defend it." (The east pole was donated by the class of 1881 on its twenty-fifth anniversary in 1906.)
  - Mount Olivet Cemetery in Queens contains the burial lot of the Robert J. Marks Post # 560 of the GAR. In the lot are the graves of 25 veterans, 17 wives and a monument.

=== North Dakota ===
- Devils Lake: GAR lot and monument in Devils Lake Cemetery.

=== Ohio ===
- Columbus: The Daughters of the Union dedicated a sundial on the grounds of the Ohio State House in 1941, the 75th anniversary of the GAR.
- Hamilton: The Daughters of the Union dedicated a sundial at Monument Park in May, 1941 to the memory of the GAR. It was restored and re-dedicated May 31, 2025
- Kettering: In 1901, The Old Guard Post 23 erected a cannon monument in Beavertown cemetery
- Urbana: W. A. Brand Post No. 98 placed a G.A.R. Civil War artillery shell monument in Oak Dale Cemetery. W. A. Brand Post No. 98 is named after William Augustus Brand (1837–1879) (66th Ohio Volunteer Infantry Regiment), which was chartered in 1881, 2 years after his death.
- Yellow Springs: On Memorial Day 1908, Burkholder Post 115 erected a 10-inch Rodman cannon in Glen Forest Cemetery. Burkholder chapter Post #115 formed on Jan 1866 and named after Antioch College student killed in action, Lt. Thomas Burkholder (8th Ohio Cavalry). 110 Years later on Memorial Day 2018, the cannon was restored and rededicated by Yellow Springs Odd Fellow Lodge #279.

=== Oregon ===
- Corvallis: GAR monument in Crystal Lake Masonic Cemetery.
- Portland: Grand Army of the Republic Cemetery. Salmon Brown, son of the famous abolitionist John Brown (of the song "John Brown's Body"), is buried there.

=== Pennsylvania ===
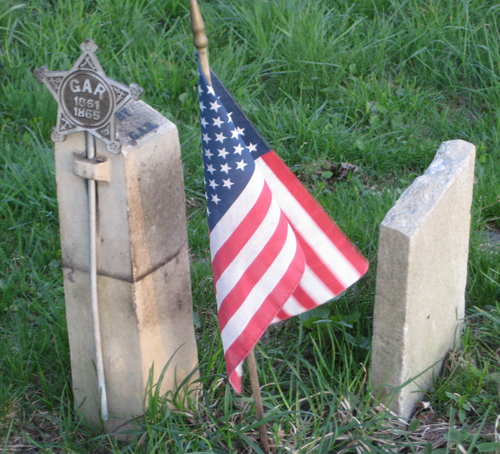
A G.A.R. marker at Brush Creek Cemetery, near Irwin, Pennsylvania

- Carnegie: When the Andrew Carnegie Free Library and Music Hall was constructed in 1901, it included a room to house the Captain Thomas Espy Post Number 153 of the GAR. The room is now preserved with artifacts and records left when the last post member died in the 1930s.
- Philadelphia:
  - GAR museum and library maintained by the Philadelphia Camp Sons of Union Veterans of the Civil War in the John Ruan House. The archive holds numerous GAR post records and the museum has a variety of civil war artifacts.
  - Monument "In memory of the members of Courtland Saunders Post No. 21 G.A.R. Dept. PA." at the corner of Belmont Avenue and South Georges Hill Road.
- Pittsburgh: Soldiers & Sailors Hall dedicated in 1910 as a GAR memorial.
- Titusville: The original charter and other documents from Cornelius S. Chase Post 50, including its handwritten by-laws, are on display at the Cleo J. Ross Post 368 American Legion in Titusville.
- Wilkes-Barre: G. A. R. Memorial Junior Senior High School opened in 1925

=== Tennessee ===
- Cleveland: The GAR Monument at Fort Hill Cemetery is only one of three GAR memorials in Tennessee.

=== Texas ===
- Fort Worth: A GAR Monument occupies a site in Oakwood Cemetery.

=== Vermont ===
- Vermont: State Route 15 is known as the Grand Army of the Republic Highway.
- Rutland: Memorial Hall dedicated in 1899, served as the library until the 1930s

=== Washington ===
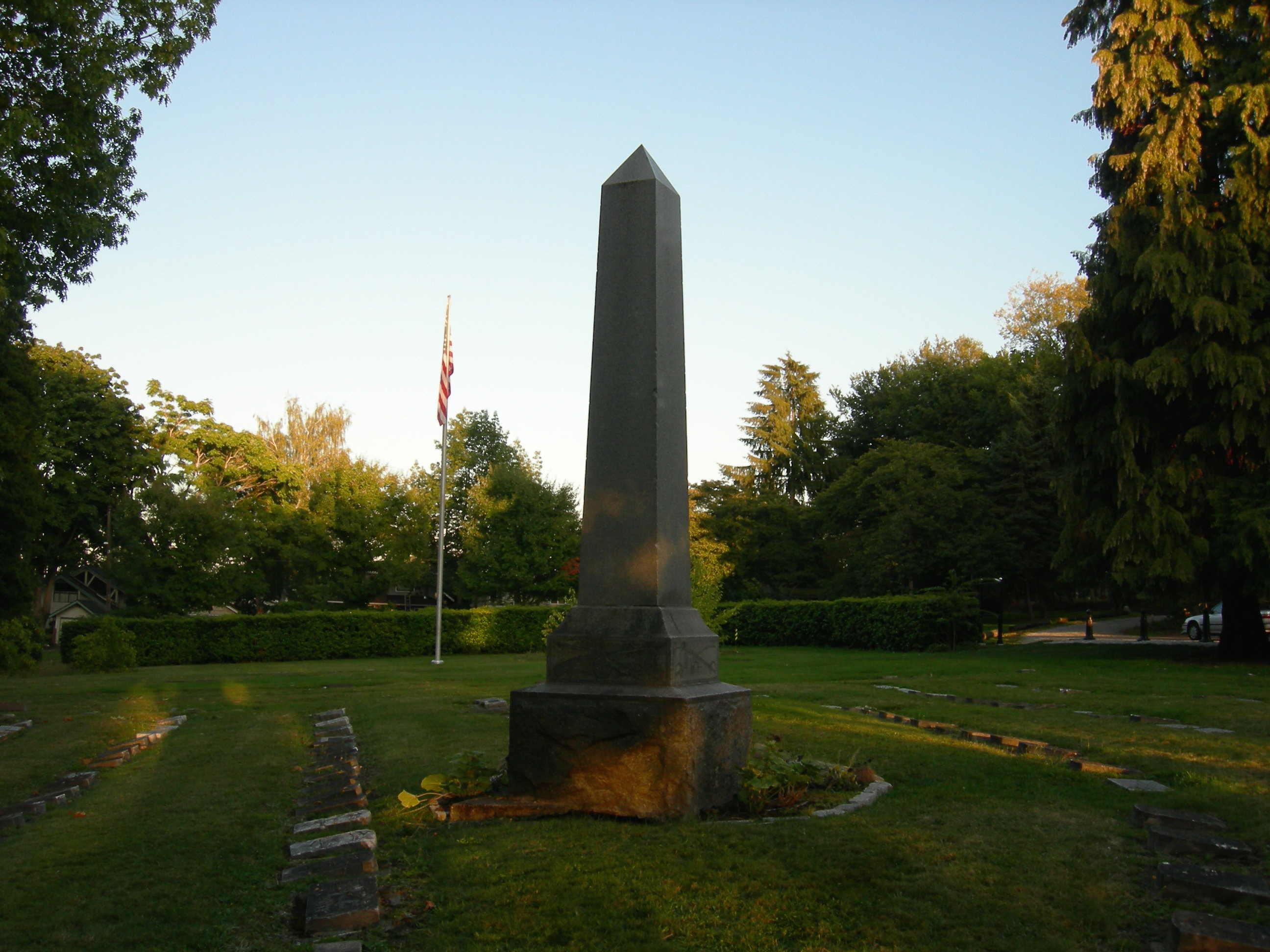
Seattle GAR Park

- Bellingham: Cornwall Memorial Park, memorial dedicated to the Grand Army of the Republic, Department of Washington and Alaska.
- Port Angeles: Memorial garden in downtown with a plaque honoring the Grand Army of the Republic.
- Port Orchard: Sedgwick Road, Sedgwick Cemetery and Sedgwick Junior High were all named after Ladies of G.A.R. General John Sedgwick Circle of Harper and Colby founded the cemetery. This cemetery was named in honor of General John Sedgwick, a Civil War Officer. In the year 1905, a group of women, wives, daughters, and nieces of Civil War Veterans, organized the General Sedgwick Circle, No. 28, Ladies of the G.A.R., Women's Auxiliary of the Grand Army of the Republic.
- Seattle: The city's five GAR posts established Grand Army of the Republic Cemetery on Capitol Hill, just north of Lake View Cemetery in 1895. In 1922, the groups ceded control to the Seattle Parks Department.
- Snohmish: GAR Morton Post 110 established Grand Army of the Republic Cemetery was established in 1889 at 8602 Riverview Road. It contains the graves of 200 Civil War veterans. On May 29, 1914, the community dedicated a monument at the northwest corner of the cemetery consisting of an obelisk and statue of a soldier on a base.
- Tacoma: Oakwood Hill Cemetery has large section containing several hundred GAR veterans who were members of the Custer Post and their wives.

=== Wisconsin ===
- Boscobel: Granite monument to the unknown dead of the Civil War is in Veteran's Park at the corners of Pearl and Mound streets. It was dedicated in 1907 by the John McDermott GAR Post No. 101 and the John McDermott Women's Relief Corps No. 32.
- Columbus: A bronze figure of a soldier atop a square granite column was erected by the H.M. Brown Post 146 of the GAR at the intersection of West James Street (Highway 60) and Dickason Boulevard (Highway 16), adjacent to the City Hall.
- Eau Claire: G.A.R. Monument and G.A.R. burial plot in Lakeview Cemetery. Donated by the Women's Auxiliary Corps.
- Kenosha: Lovell GAR Post 230 Civil War Memorial; Dedicated 1889; Located Green Ridge Cemetery in Kenosha.
- La Crosse: G.A.R. Monument in Oak Grove Cemetery
- Ladysmith: G.A.R. Monument in Ladysmith Park
- Lake Hallie, Wisconsin: G.A.R. Monument in Prairie View Cemetery
- Lowell: G.A.R. Monument in the Lowell City Cemetery.
- Madison: Grand Army of the Republic Conference Room at the Wisconsin State Capitol
- Manitowoc: GAR Walker Post 18 Monument (Civil War); Dedicated 1934; Located Section B, Evergreen Cemetery.
- Menomonie: GAR (Grand Army of the Republic) monument in Evergreen Cemetery
- Necedah: Flagpole and inscribed tablet in Bay View Cemetery; North Main and Maple Streets
- Oshkosh: GAR Monument (Civil War); Dedicated 1894; Located Riverside Cemetery
- Wausau: Six graves surround a red granite memorial bearing the GAR badge in Pine Grove Cemetery.

== See also ==
- Grand Army of the Republic Hall (disambiguation)
