= Grand Army of the Republic Hall =

Grand Army of the Republic Hall, GAR Building, or variants thereof, may refer to:

== Florida ==
- Grand Army of the Republic Memorial Hall (St. Cloud, Florida)

== Idaho ==
- Grand Army of the Republic Hall (Boise, Idaho)

== Illinois ==
- Grand Army of the Republic Hall (Aurora, Illinois)
- Grand Army of the Republic Memorial Hall (Peoria. Illinois)

== Iowa ==
- G.A.R. Memorial Hall (Algona, Iowa)
- Franklin County G. A. R. Soldiers' Memorial Hall (Iowa)

== Massachusetts ==
- Grand Army of the Republic Hall (Lynn, Massachusetts), listed on the National Register of Historic Places
- Grand Army of the Republic Hall (Orange, Massachusetts)
- Grand Army of the Republic Hall (Rockland, Massachusetts)
- Grand Army of the Republic Hall (Worcester, Massachusetts)
- Lothrop Memorial Building-G.A.R. Hall, Taunton, Massachusetts

== Michigan ==
- Grand Army of the Republic Building (Detroit), Detroit, Michigan, listed on the NRHP in Wayne County, Michigan
- Grand Army of the Republic Hall (Marshall, Michigan), a state historic site in Calhoun County
- Sunfield G. A. R. Hall, listed on the National Register of Historic Places

== Minnesota ==
- Clearwater Masonic and Grand Army of the Republic Hall, also known as Clearwater Masonic Lodge
- Grand Army of the Republic Hall (Grand Meadow, Minnesota)
- Grand Army of the Republic Hall (Litchfield, Minnesota)

== Nebraska ==
- Grand Army of the Republic Memorial Hall (Nebraska City, Nebraska)

== New Hampshire ==
- Grand Army of the Republic Hall (Peterborough), see List of memorials to the Grand Army of the Republic § New Hampshire

== New York ==
- Grand Army of the Republic Hall (Halsey Valley, New York)
- G.A.R. Memorial Hall (Hunt, New York)

== Ohio ==
- Grand Army of the Republic Memorial Hall (Ironton, Ohio), on the National Register of Historic Places listings in Lawrence County, Ohio

== Pennsylvania ==
- Grand Army of the Republic Hall (Johnstown, Pennsylvania)
- GAR Building (Lykens, Pennsylvania), listed on the National Register of Historic Places in Dauphin County, Pennsylvania

== South Dakota ==
- Grand Army of the Republic Hall (Yankton, South Dakota), G.A.R. Hall Art Gallery (Home of Yankton Area Arts Association)

== Wisconsin ==
- Boscobel Grand Army of the Republic Hall, Boscobel, Wisconsin
- Grand Army of the Republic Memorial Hall, now the Wisconsin Veterans Museum, Madison

== See also ==
- Grand Army of the Republic
- Grand Army of the Republic Memorial (disambiguation)
- Franklin County G. A. R. Soldiers' Memorial Hall (Iowa)
- Grand Army Plaza, Manhattan, New York
- G. A. R. Memorial Junior Senior High School
- Memorial Hall (Rockford, Illinois)
- National Civil War Museum, Harrisburg, Pennsylvania
- New England Civil War Museum, Rockville, Connecticut
- Porter County Memorial Opera Hall
