= Grand Army of the Republic Memorial =

Grand Army of the Republic Memorial may refer to:

- Stephenson Grand Army of the Republic Memorial, Washington, D.C.
- Grand Army of the Republic Memorial (Judsonia, Arkansas), listed on the National Register of Historic Places in White County, Arkansas
- Grand Army of the Republic Memorial (Siloam Springs, Arkansas), listed on the National Register of Historic Places in Benton County, Arkansas

== See also ==
- Grand Army of the Republic
- List of memorials to the Grand Army of the Republic
- Grand Army of the Republic Hall (disambiguation)
- Grand Army of the Republic Cemetery (Portland, Oregon)
- Grand Army of the Republic Cemetery (Seattle)
