= Grand Army of the Republic Hall (Rockland, Massachusetts) =

- U.S. National Register of Historic Places
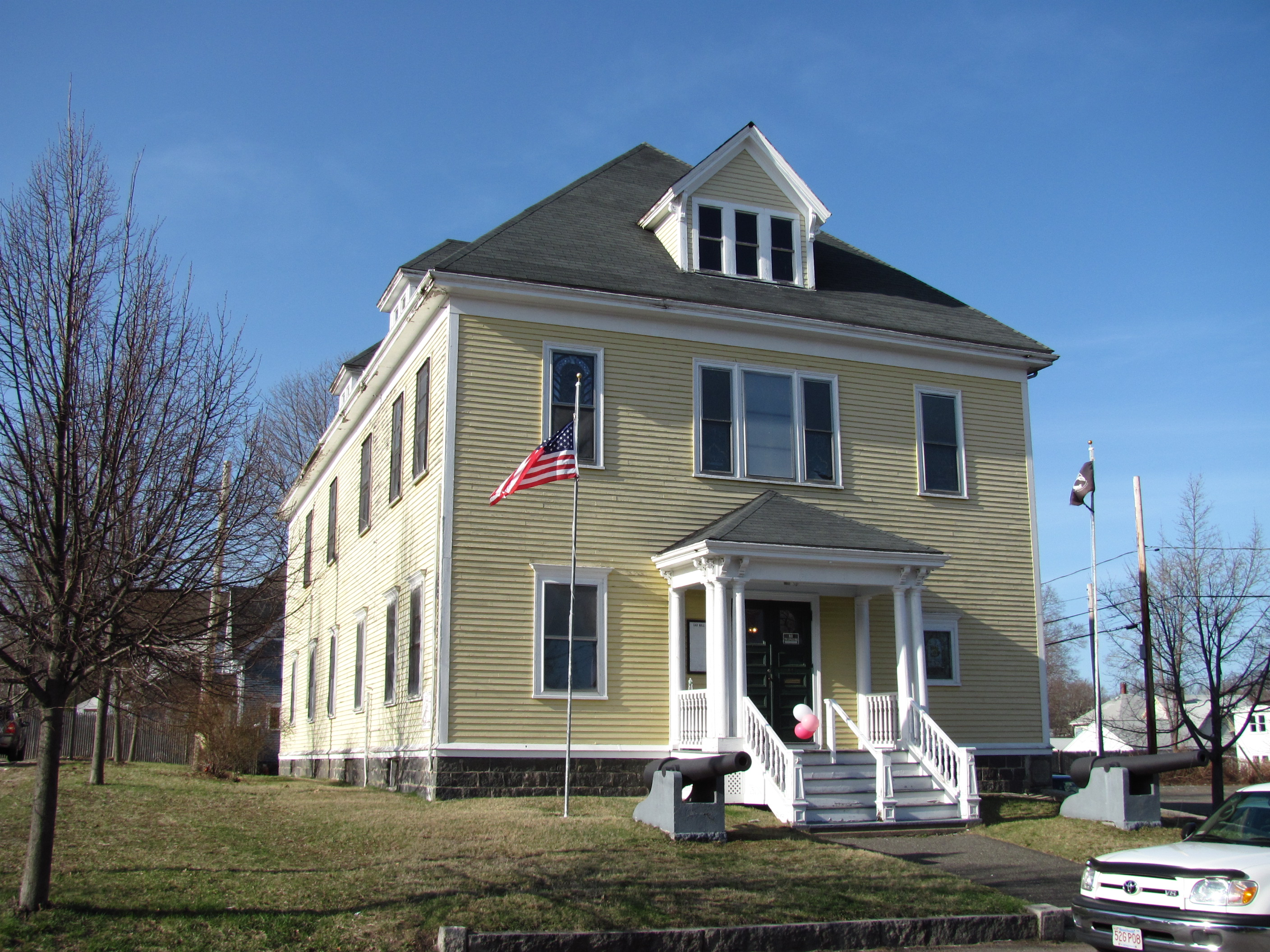
- Grand Army of the Republic Hall

- Location within Massachusetts Location within the United States
- Location: 4 School Street; Rockland, Massachusetts
- Coordinates: 42°7′44.0″N 70°54′49.6″W
- Built: 1899
- NRHP reference No.: 97000438
- Added to NRHP: May 16, 1997

The Grand Army of the Republic Hall is a historic building located at 34 School Street in Rockland, Massachusetts, in the United States. The hall was designed by local builder William Harrison Hebberd, and built in 1899 by members of the GAR as a memorial to the Union Army veterans of the Civil War. It is a somewhat plainly decorated two-story wood-frame building with a hip roof. Its most elaborate exterior feature is the main entry, a porch supported by clusters of narrow columns, and with brackets in its eaves. The interior is more elaborately decorated, and has retained most of its original Queen Anne details.

On May 16, 1997, the building was added to the National Register of Historic Places.

== Meetings ==
The hall was the meeting place of the Gen. George L. Hartsuff GAR Post No. 74, which was one of 210 post in the Department of Massachusetts. It is now the meeting place of the Gen. George L. Hartsuff Camp No. 50 of the Sons of Union Veterans of the Civil War, the successor organization to the Grand Army of the Republic.

== See also ==
- Grand Army of the Republic Hall (disambiguation)
- National Register of Historic Places listings in Plymouth County, Massachusetts
- Sons of Union Veterans of the Civil War
