= Grand Army of the Republic Hall (Boise, Idaho) =

Coordinates: 43°37′07″N 116°12′00″W

- Grand Army of the Republic Hall; Boise, Idaho
- U.S. National Register of Historic Places
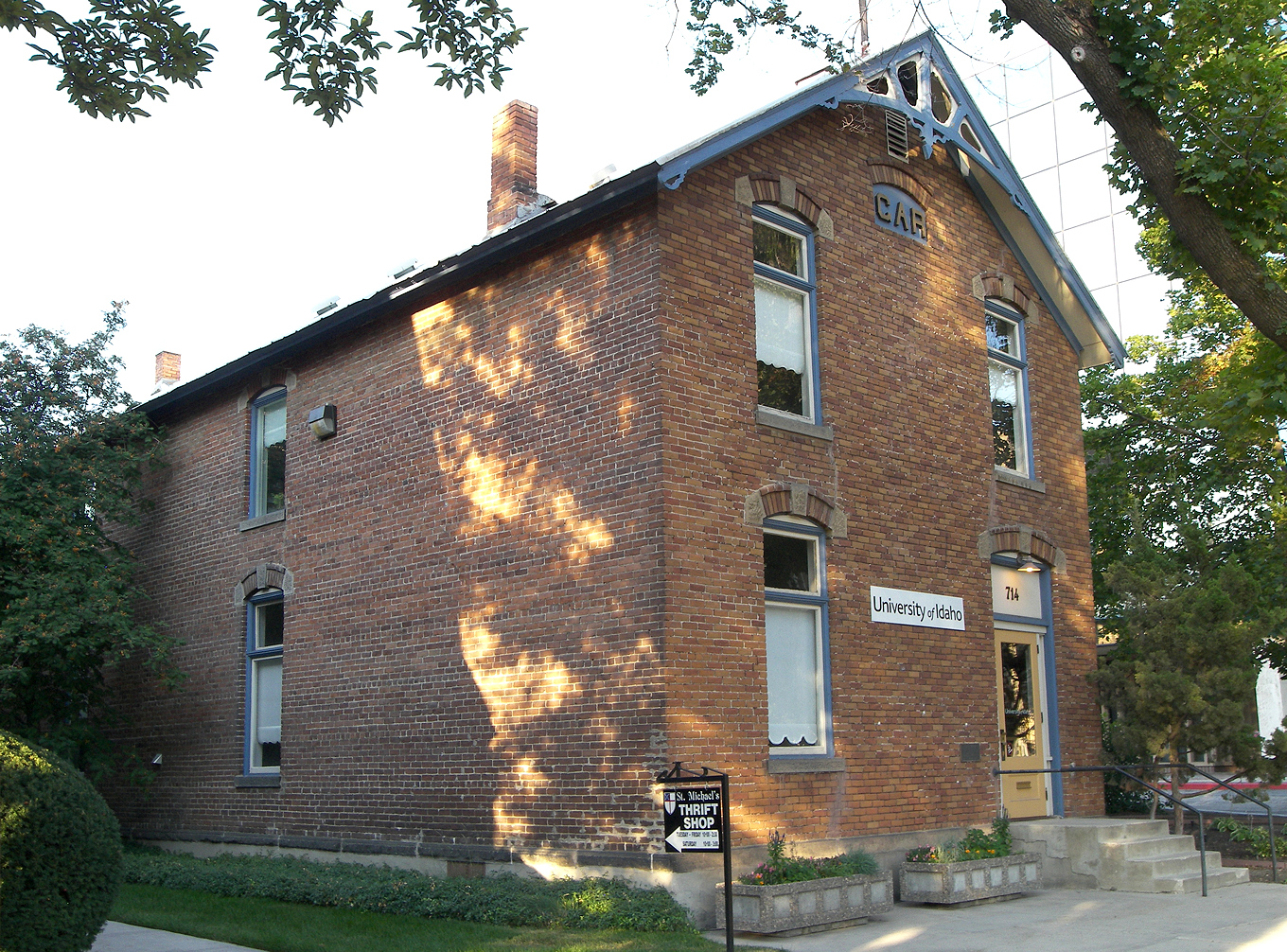
- The GAR Hall in 2009.

- Location within Idaho Location within the United States
- Location: 714 W. State Street; Boise, Idaho
- Built: 1892
- NRHP reference No.: 74000727
- Added to NRHP: January 21, 1974

The Grand Army of the Republic Hall is an historic Grand Army of the Republic building located at 714 W. State Street in Boise, Idaho.

== History ==
The hall was built in 1892 by members of the GAR as a memorial to the Union Army veterans of the Civil War. It was the meeting place of Phil Sheridan GAR Post No. 4, which was named for Union General Philip Sheridan. It was one of 32 GAR halls in Idaho.

On January 21, 1974, it was added to the National Register of Historic Places.

The building, which is across the street from the Idaho State Capitol, is now used for University of Idaho administration offices.

== See also ==
- Grand Army of the Republic Hall (disambiguation)
- List of Registered Historic Places in Idaho
- Sons of Union Veterans of the Civil War
