= Grand Army of the Republic Memorial Hall (Nebraska City, Nebraska) =

- Grand Army of the Republic; Memorial Hall; Nebraska City, Nebraska
- U.S. National Register of Historic Places
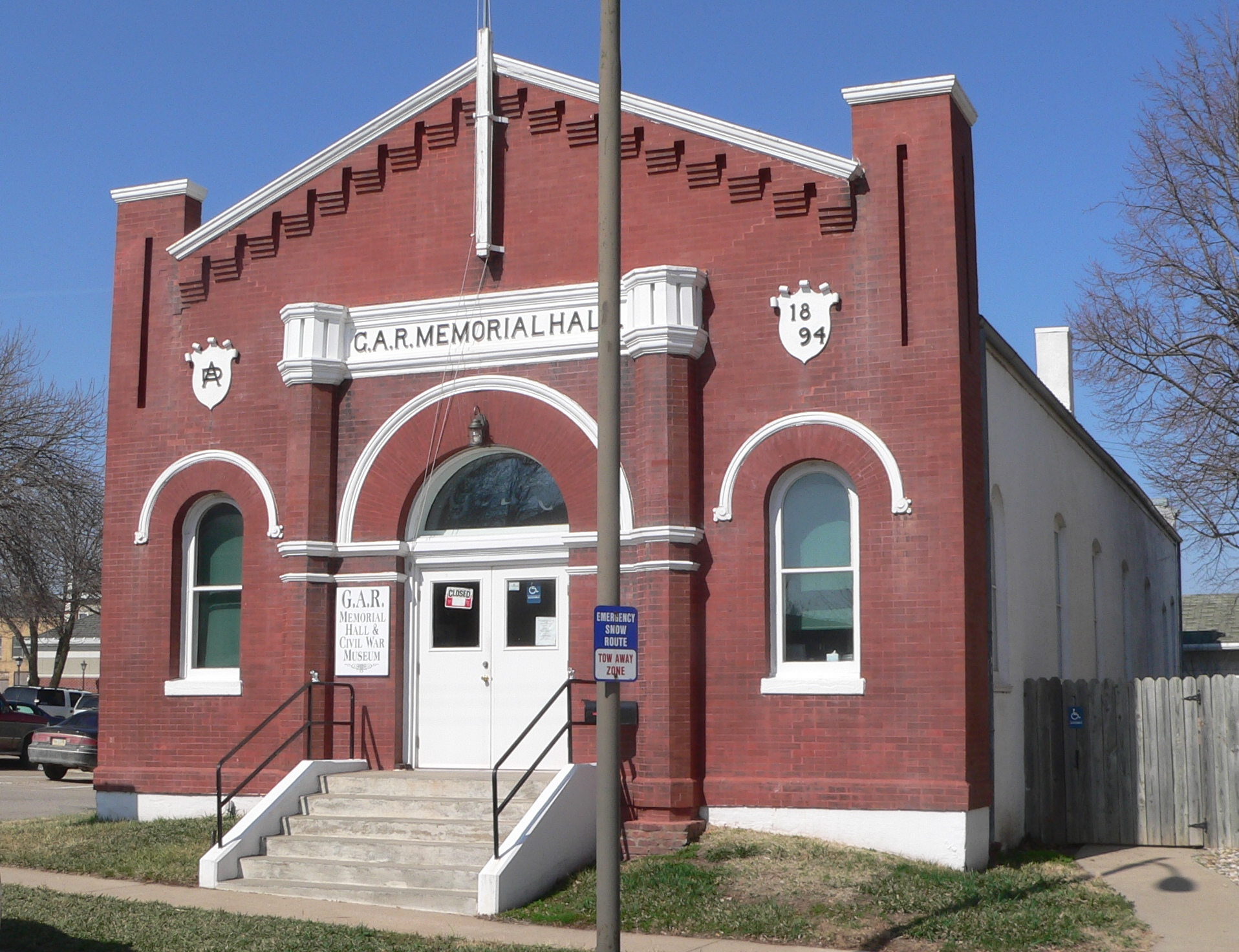
- G.A.R. Hall, seen from the southeast.

- Location within Nebraska Location within the United States
- Location: Nebraska City, Nebraska
- Coordinates: 40°40′33.3″N 95°51′24.8″W
- Built: 1894–95
- NRHP reference No.: 94000067
- Added to NRHP: February 25, 1994

The Grand Army of the Republic Memorial Hall, also known as William Baumer Post No. 24, Grand Army of the Republic (GAR), and the Civil War Veterans Museum, is a historic building located at 908 (now 910) 1st Corso in Nebraska City, Nebraska, in the United States. The hall was built in 1894–95. In 1994, it was added to the U.S. National Register of Historic Places.

== History ==
The Richardsonian Romanesque Grand Army of the Republic Memorial Hall was designed and built in 1894–95 by architects Fisher & Lawrie, and was the meeting place of the William Baumer Post No. 24, one of 354 GAR posts in Nebraska. The hall has been restored and is now the Civil War Veterans Museum at the GAR Memorial Hall.

== See also ==
- Grand Army of the Republic Hall (disambiguation)
- List of Registered Historic Places in Nebraska
- Sons of Union Veterans of the Civil War
