= Grand Army of the Republic Memorial Hall (Ironton, Ohio) =

- U.S. National Register of Historic Places
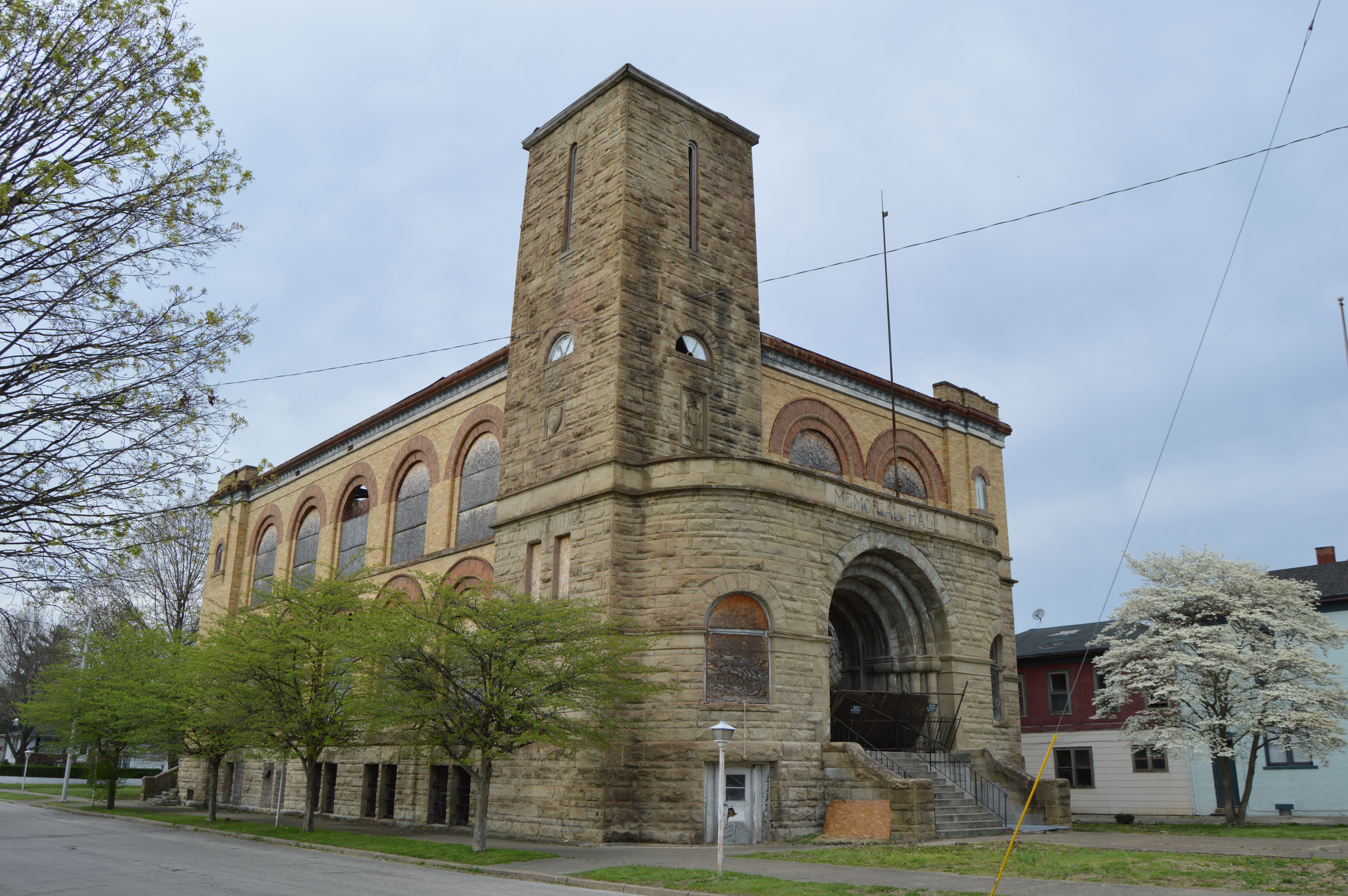
- Front and western side; the windows are gone, and the roof has caved in

- Location within Ohio Location within the United States
- Location: 401 Railroad St., Ironton, Ohio
- Coordinates: 38.53728°N 82.68528°W
- Built: 1892
- Architect: Joseph W. Yost
- Architectural style: Richardsonian Romanesque
- NRHP reference No.: 12000801
- Added to NRHP: September 19, 2012

The Grand Army of the Republic Memorial Hall, built in 1892, is an historic building located at 401 Railroad Street in Ironton, Ohio. Designed by noted Ohio architect Joseph W. Yost in the Richardsonian Romanesque style of architecture, it was built to serve as a Grand Army of the Republic memorial and the meeting hall of Dick Lambert Post No. 165 of the GAR. It later served as the meeting hall of the now long-defunct American Legion Post No. 59 as well as the Ironton city hall. After being abandoned by the city, American Legion Post No. 433 undertook the task of restoring the long neglected veteran's memorial. On September 19, 2012, the building was added to the National Register of Historic Places. On May 28, 2014, demolition of the building began.

== See also ==
- Grand Army of the Republic Hall (disambiguation)
- National Register of Historic Places listings in Lawrence County, Ohio* Sons of Union Veterans of the Civil War
