= Grand Army of the Republic Hall (Halsey Valley, New York) =

- Halsey Valley Grand Army of the Republic Meeting Hall
- U.S. National Register of Historic Places
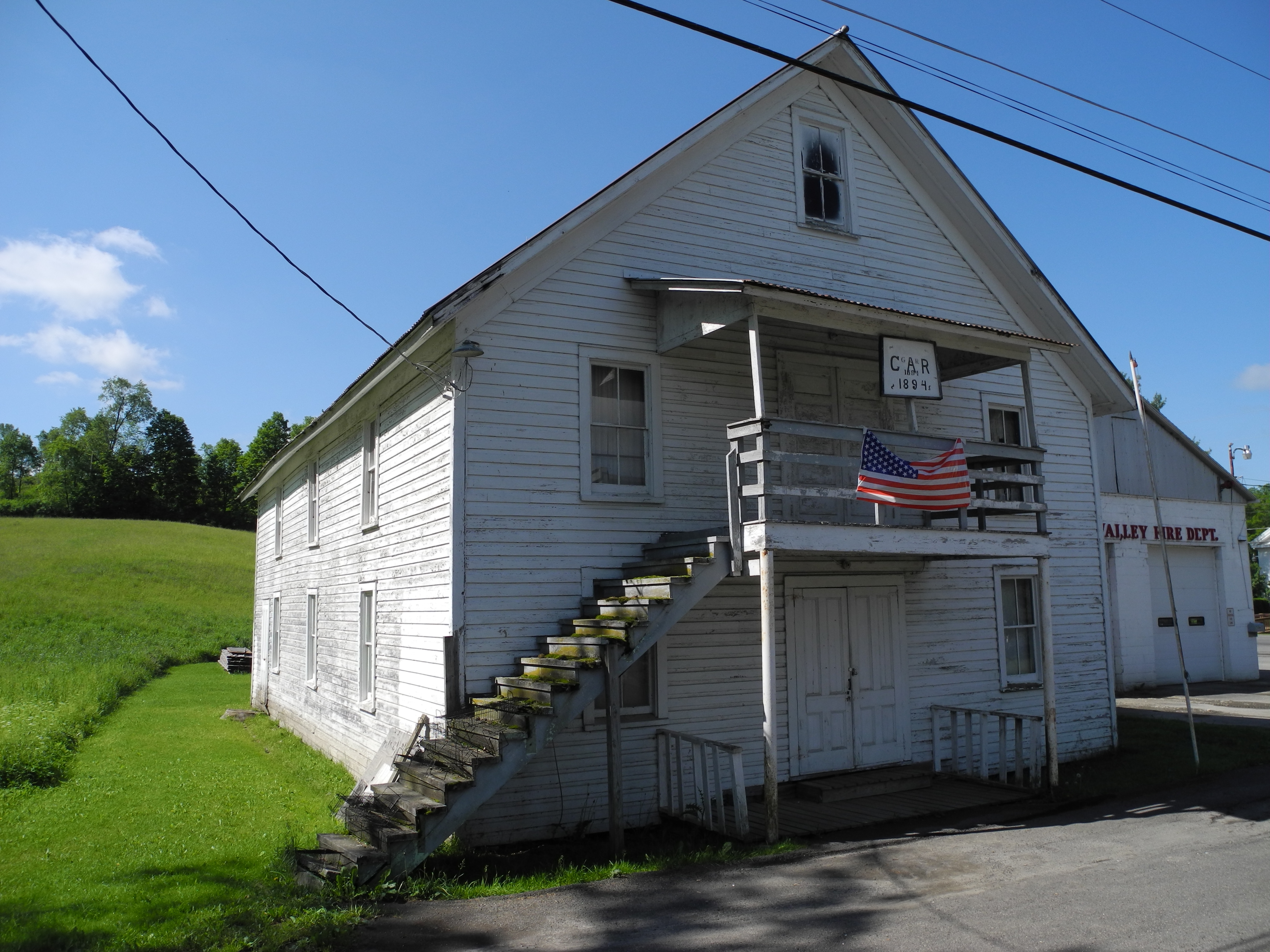

- Location within New York Location within the United States
- Location: Hamilton Valley Road Halsey Valley Spencer, New York
- Coordinates: 42.14113°N 76.44095°W
- Built: 1894
- NRHP reference No.: 02001646
- Added to NRHP: January 23, 2003

The Grand Army of the Republic Hall, also known as John M. Hagadorn Post No. 505, Grand Army of the Republic and the Schuyler F. Smith Camp No. 193, Sons of Union Veterans of the Civil War, and Halsey Valley Grand Army of the Republic Meeting Hall, is an historic building located on Hamilton Valley Road in Halsey Valley near Spencer, New York, in the United States. The hall was built in 1894 and on January 23, 2003, it was added to the U.S. National Register of Historic Places.

== Original use ==
The hall was the meeting place of the John M. Hagadorn Post No. 505, which was one of 670 GAR posts in New York. It was also used as the meeting place of the Schuyler F. Smith Camp No. 193, SUVCW.

== Current use ==
In September 1998, the Schuyler F. Smith Camp No. 193, SUVCW, was reactivated. It now meets in the hall on the first Sunday afternoon of each month.

== See also ==
- Grand Army of the Republic
- Grand Army of the Republic Hall (disambiguation)
- List of Registered Historic Places in Tioga County, New York
- Sons of Union Veterans of the Civil War
