= Grand Army of the Republic Memorial Hall (St. Cloud, Florida) =

- Grand Army of the Republic; Memorial Hall
- U.S. National Register of Historic Places
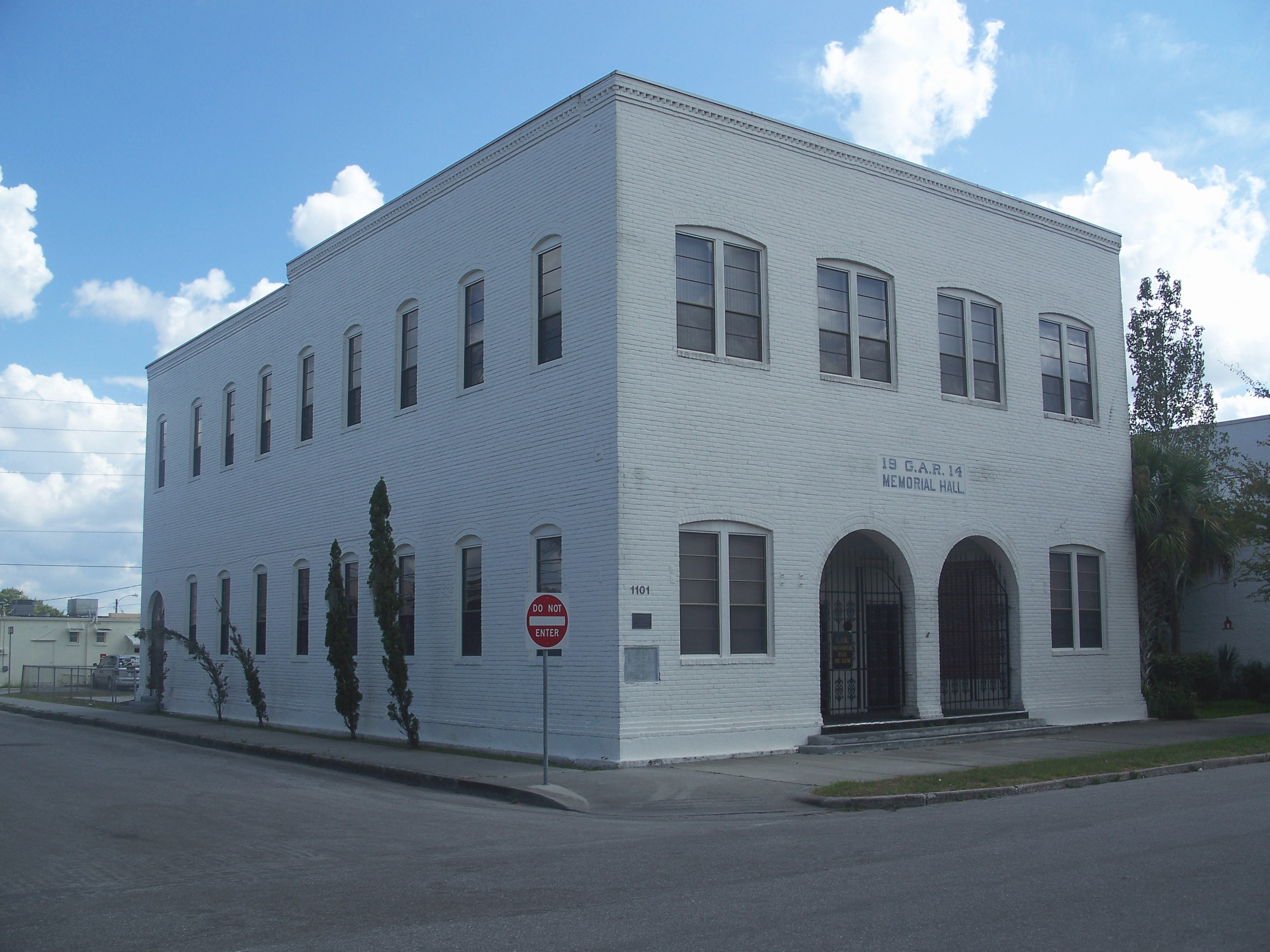

- Location within Florida Location within the United States
- Location: 1101 Massachusetts Avenue; St. Cloud, Florida
- Coordinates: 28°14′51″N 81°17′5″W
- Built: 1914
- NRHP reference No.: 97000097
- Added to NRHP: February 21, 1997

The Grand Army of the Republic Memorial Hall is an historic building located at 1101 Massachusetts Avenue in St. Cloud, Florida, in the United States. The city of St. Cloud had been founded by the Grand Army of the Republic or GAR, as a retirement colony for its members. The hall was built in 1914 by members of the GAR as a memorial to the Union Army veterans of the Civil War. It was one of many such halls built in the country. On February 21, 1997, it was added to the U.S. National Register of Historic Places.

== National Register listing ==
- Grand Army of the Republic Memorial Hall ** (added 1997 - Building - #97000097)
- Also known as G.A.R. Memorial Hall
- 1101 Massachusetts Ave., St. Cloud
- Historic Significance: Event, Architecture/Engineering
- Architect, builder, or engineer: Chessman, M.W.
- Architectural Style: Early Commercial
- Area of Significance: Architecture, Community Planning And Development, Social History
- Period of Significance: 1900–1924, 1925–1949
- Owner: Private
- Historic Function: Social
- Historic Sub-function: Meeting Hall
- Current Function: Commerce/Trade, Recreation And Culture
- Current Sub-function: Museum, Professional

== Meetings ==
The hall was the meeting place of the Lucius L. Mitchell GAR Post No. 34, which was named for the first Union veteran to die in the St. Cloud colony, and which was one of 34 GAR posts in Florida. It is now the meeting place of the Lucius L Mitchell Camp No. 4 of the Sons of Union Veterans of the Civil War, the successor organization to the Grand Army of the Republic.

== See also ==
- National Register of Historic Places listings in Florida
- Grand Army of the Republic Hall (disambiguation)
- Sons of Union Veterans of the Civil War
