= Cornwall Park =

Cornwall Park may refer to:

- Cornwall Park (Bellingham, Washington)
- Cornwall Park, Auckland The park around One Tree Hill, New Zealand (which is distinct from the hill, and much larger).
- Cornwall Park in Hastings, New Zealand, the main park in the city.
