= New England Civil War Museum =

Coordinates: 41.8675°N 72.4483°W

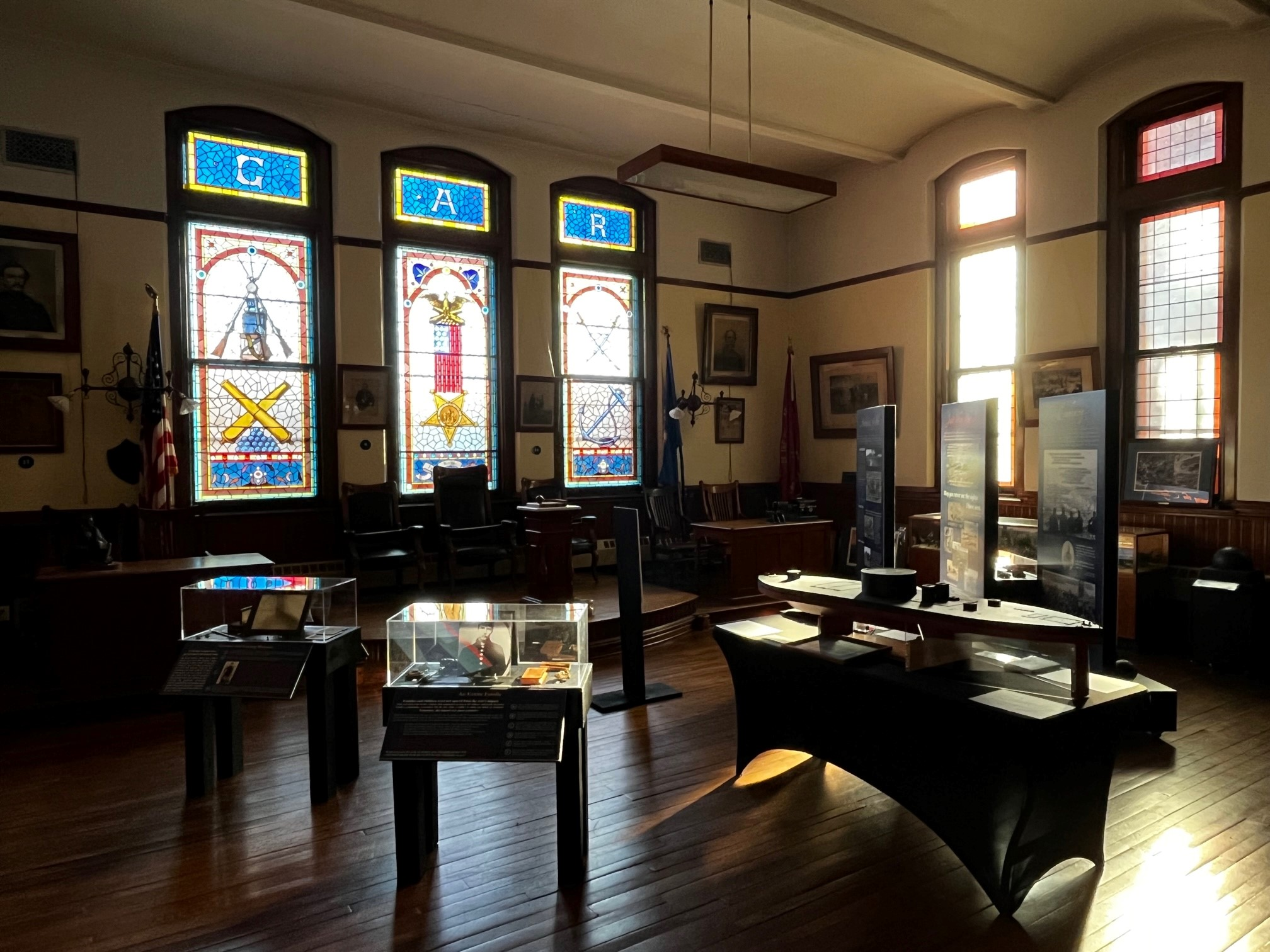
Interior view of the original stained-glass windows bearing the symbology of the Grand Army of the Republic.

The New England Civil War Museum and Research Center occupies a portion of Memorial Hall, which was purpose-built for use by Grand Army of the Republic (GAR) Civil War veterans in Rockville, Connecticut. Thomas F. Burpee Post #71 of the Grand Army of the Republic held their meetings in the Grand Hall from 1890 until 1929. Alden Skinner Camp #45 of the Sons of Union Veterans of the Civil War, their direct heir, have held their monthly meetings in the hall since 1890, making it the oldest continuously-used GAR Hall in the entire country.

== Permanent Collection and Facilities ==
Most of the museum's original collection was donated by the Civil War veterans of Burpee Post. The museum's permanent collection today holds hundreds of items from the Civil War period, the post-war period during which the GAR was active, and the period to current day related to the Allied Orders. Most notable are the following sub-collections:

Hirst brothers' letters and artifact collection (14th Connecticut Volunteer Infantry)

- Thomas F. Burpee artifact collection (Colonel, 21st Connecticut Volunteer Infantry)
- Kilbourne Newell artifact collection (14th Connecticut Volunteer Infantry)
- Charles Weston artifact collection (musician, 5th & 7th Connecticut Volunteer Infantry)
- George H. Nelson letters collection (25th Connecticut Volunteer Infantry)
- Walter Patterson letters collection (1st Connecticut Heavy Artillery)

The museum also contains the O'Connell-Chapman Library, which has thousands of volumes of Civil War literature, in addition to original copies of the 128 volumes of The War of the Rebellion: a Compilation of the Official Records of the Union and Confederate Armies. This was compiled by the US War Department and originally published from 1880–1901. The Library also owns the original Civil War map books that accompanies the Office Records and several photographs of local Civil War veterans.

In the spaces currently occupied by the museum, the Grand Hall still retains the original windows, woodwork finishes, and furnishings. The museum and library, along with the hall and its rooms, are maintained by Alden Skinner Camp #45 of the Sons of Union Veterans of the Civil War, with close partnership with the Town of Vernon. The Sons camp hosts monthly meetings open to the public, often bringing in authors and historians for subject presentations.

The Memorial Hall has also been used for meetings by other hereditary organizations, including the Connecticut Commandery of the Military Order of the Loyal Legion of the United States (MOLLUS), the Daughters of the Union, the Daughters of the American Revolution (DAR), Woman's Relief Corps (WRC), and the Auxiliary to the Sons of Union Veterans of the Civil War.

== Notable events held in the GAR Hall ==
- August 9, 1892: Reunion of the 5th Connecticut Regiment
- September 16, 1893: Reunion of the 14th Connecticut Regiment
- August 18, 1896: Reunion of the 25th Connecticut Regiment
- September 17, 1909: Reunion of the 14th Connecticut Regiment
- September 20, 1920: Reunion of the 11th Connecticut Regiment

== See also ==
- Grand Army of the Republic Hall (disambiguation), listing of halls in numerous places
- National Civil War Museum
