= Grand Army of the Republic Hall (Worcester, Massachusetts) =

- G.A.R. Hall
- U.S. National Register of Historic Places
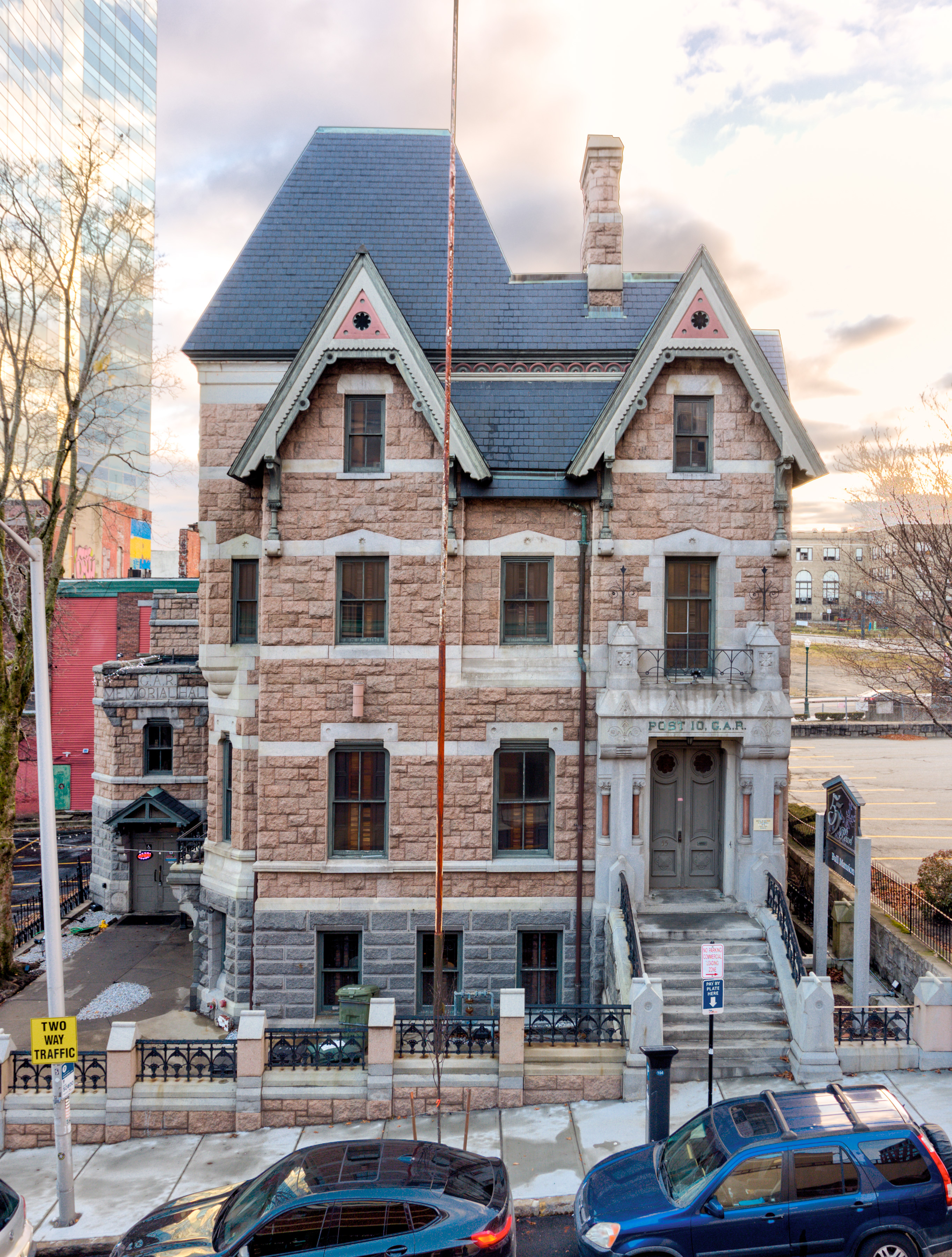

- Location within Massachusetts Location within the United States
- Location: 55 Pearl St., Worcester, Massachusetts
- Coordinates: 42°15′50″N 71°48′15″W
- Area: less than one acre
- Built: 1876
- Architect: Calvert Vaux
- Architectural style: Stick/Eastlake
- NRHP reference No.: 75000303
- Added to NRHP: March 13, 1975

The G.A.R. Hall, formerly the Bull Mansion, is a historic Grand Army of the Republic Hall at in Worcester, Massachusetts. It is an ornate Victorian Gothic/Stick style two-story granite structure, designed by noted New York City architect Calvert Vaux. The building was listed on the National Register of Historic Places in 1975.

== Description and history ==
Worcester's former G.A.R. Hall is located one block west of Main Street in downtown Worcester, on the south side of Pearl Street. It is a large masonry structure, 2-1/2 stories in height, built out of ashlar granite blocks of different colors, and covered by a steeply pitched gabled slate roof. It has applied Stick style woodwork in a number of its gables, and some of its stone window lintels feature carved rosettes. A major addition added in 1912 enlarges the original main block to the southeast. The property is fronted by a fence with granite posts that dates to the building's initial construction.

The structure was built in 1876 as the home of George and Sarah Bull. It was designed by Calvert Vaux and paid for by Daniel B. Wesson, Sarah Bull's father. George Bull, a young doctor, found the house too expensive to keep, and eventually separated from his wife and moved west. Helen Marble, wife of the next owner, was the daughter of Ethan Allen, who was like Daniel Wesson involved in the manufacture of arms. The building was sold to the local GAR chapter in 1912, with an addition made to it that was designed by Worcester architect Stephen C. Earle. It was eventually turned over to the city as a memorial to all of its war veterans, and has since changed hands and uses several times. It presently houses a restaurant.

== See also ==
- National Register of Historic Places listings in northwestern Worcester, Massachusetts
- National Register of Historic Places listings in Worcester County, Massachusetts
