= Spencer, New York =

- Town
- Location within New York
- Coordinates: 42°13′N 76°30′W
- Country: United States
- State: New York
- County: Tioga
- Named for: Ambrose Spencer

Area
  - Total: 49.9 sq mi (129 km^{2})
  - Land: 49.5 sq mi (128 km^{2})
  - Water: 0.3 sq mi (0.78 km^{2})

Population (2020)
  - Total: 2,976
- Website: https://townofspencerny.gov/

Spencer is a town in Tioga County, New York, United States. The population was 2,976 at the 2020 census. The town and its primary village are named after Ambrose Spencer. It lies on the western border of the county and is south of Ithaca. Inside the town is the Village of Spencer. The village of Candor borders the town to the east and southeast, with Waverly to the southwest and Van Etten to the west, while Danby is to the north.

== History ==
The land for the town was purchased in 1791 and settlement began in 1794. When the town was organized in 1806 from the Town of Tioga (the Old Town of Owego), it contained territory that is now in more newly organized towns: Candor (1811), Caroline (1811), Danby (1811), Newfield (1811), and Cayuta (1824) in Tioga and other counties.

The Halsey Valley Grand Army of the Republic Meeting Hall was listed on the National Register of Historic Places in 2003.

Town resident Cal Harris was tried four times for murder, and ultimately acquitted, over a decade following the 2001 disappearance of his estranged wife.

== Geography ==
According to the United States Census Bureau, the town has a total area of 49.9 square miles (129 km^{2}), of which 49.5 square miles (128 km^{2}) is land and 0.3 square miles (0.78 km^{2}), or 0.68%, is water.

The eastern town line is the border of Chemung County and the northern town line is the border of Tompkins County.

Conjoined New York State Route 34 and New York State Route 96 divide at Spencer village.

== Demographics ==
Historical population
Census	Pop.	Note	%±
1820	1,252		—
1830	1,253		0.1%
1840	1,532		22.3%
1850	1,782		16.3%
1860	1,881		5.6%
1870	1,863		−1.0%
1880	2,382		27.9%
1890	2,211		−7.2%
1900	1,868		−15.5%
1910	1,529		−18.1%
1920	1,526		−0.2%
1930	1,480		−3.0%
1940	1,462		−1.2%
1950	1,561		6.8%
1960	1,790		14.7%
1970	2,232		24.7%
1980	2,633		18.0%
1990	2,881		9.4%
2000	2,982		3.5%
2010	3,153		5.7%
2020	2,976		−5.6%
2021 (est.)	2,942	▼	−1.1%
U.S. Decennial Census

As of the census of 2000, there were 2,979 people, 1,153 households, and 817 families residing in the town. The population density was 60.1 inhabitants per square mile (23.2/km^{2}). There were 1,271 housing units at an average density of 25.7 per square mile (9.9/km^{2}). The racial makeup of the town was 97.28% White, 0.67% Black or African American, 0.20% Native American, 0.37% Asian, 0.47% from other races, and 1.01% from two or more races. Hispanic or Latino of any race were 1.28% of the population.

There were 1,153 households, out of which 35.7% had children under the age of 18 living with them, 55.9% were married couples living together, 10.8% had a female householder with no husband present, and 29.1% were non-families. 23.2% of all households were made up of individuals, and 7.3% had someone living alone who was 65 years of age or older. The average household size was 2.58 and the average family size was 3.03.

In the town, the population was spread out, with 28.7% under the age of 18, 5.8% from 18 to 24, 30.3% from 25 to 44, 24.1% from 45 to 64, and 11.0% who were 65 years of age or older. The median age was 36 years. For every 100 females, there were 97.9 males. For every 100 females age 18 and over, there were 93.2 males.

The median income for a household in the town was $37,432, and the median income for a family was $41,025. Males had a median income of $31,277 versus $25,508 for females. The per capita income for the town was $16,312. About 6.2% of families and 8.5% of the population were below the poverty line, including 9.5% of those under age 18 and 6.6% of those age 65 or over.

== Education ==
Residents are most likely to go to the Spencer-Van Etten Central School district. The mascot is the Panther, with red, black, and silver colors. They are the 2001 soccer state champions and 1994 volleyball champions. The largest rivalry is between the Candor Indians. The football rivalry championship, is the Jug Game, in which Candor had a 10-year run.

== Communities and locations in the Town of Spencer ==
- Cowells Corners – A former location east of Spencer village.
- Crum Town – A hamlet in the northeastern part of the town.
- Empire Lake – A small lake in the southeastern part of the town.
- Spencer – The Village of Spencer is centrally located in the town. Part of the village was once called "Bradleytown" and another "Drakes Settlement."
- North Spencer (formerly "Huggtown") – A hamlet in the northwestern part of the town on NY-34 and NY-96.
- Spencer Lake – a small lake southeast of North Spencer.
- West Branch of Catatonk Creek – A stream flowing from Spencer Lake past Spencer Village.
- West Candor – A hamlet by the eastern town line on NY-96.
