= Grand Army of the Republic Memorial (Siloam Springs, Arkansas) =

- U.S. National Register of Historic Places
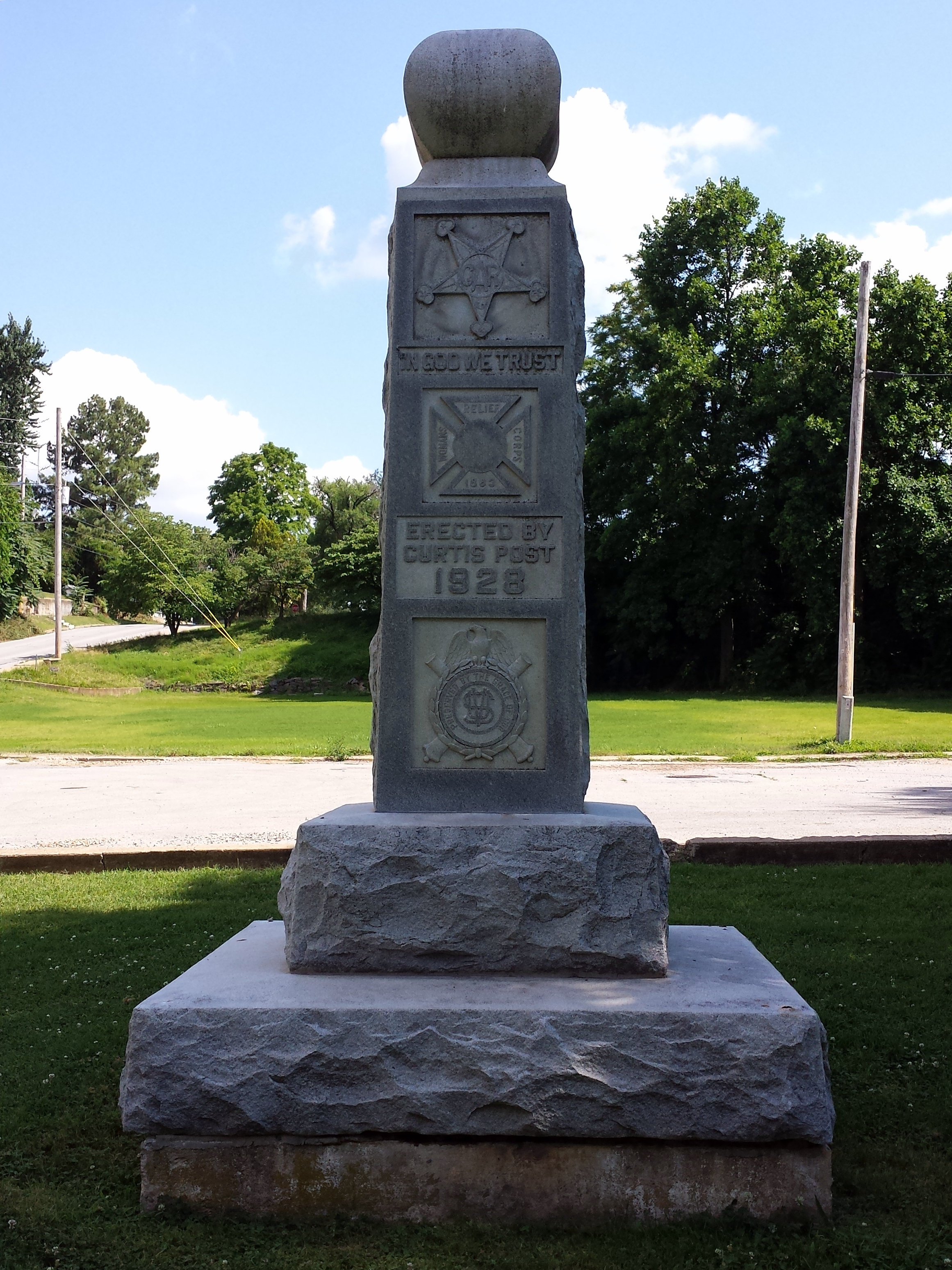

- Location within Arkansas Location within the United States
- Location: Southern end of Twin Springs Park, E of jct. of AR 43 and Twin Springs St., Siloam Springs, Arkansas
- Coordinates: 36°10′59″N 94°32′25″W
- Area: less than one acre
- Built: 1928
- Architectural style: Classical Revival
- MPS: Civil War Commemorative Sculpture MPS
- NRHP reference No.: 96000506
- Added to NRHP: May 3, 1996

The Grand Army of the Republic Memorial is a monument in Twin Springs Park of Siloam Springs, Arkansas. Located in the southern part of the park, it consists of a concrete foundation, on which rest two tiers of granite slabs, laid horizontally. These are topped by a vertical granite column that has an onion form at the top. The sides of the horizontal slabs are rusticated, as are three sides of the column. The fourth side is engraved, from the top down, with an inverted five-point star labelled "GAR", then the words "IN GOD WE TRUST", then a Maltese cross engraved "WOMEN'S RELIEF CORPS 1833", then "ERECTED BY/CURTIS POST/1928", and finally a wreath topped by an eagle and crossed cannons, with "US" in the center surrounded by "PRESERVED BY THE GRACE OF GOD". The memorial was placed in 1928, and is the only known memorial statewide to mention the Grand Army's Women's Relief Corps.

The monument was listed on the National Register of Historic Places in 1996.

== See also ==
- National Register of Historic Places listings in Benton County, Arkansas
