= National Society Daughters of the Union 1861–1865 =

American lineage society

- Abbreviation: NSDU
- Established: January 9, 1912; 114 years ago
- Founders: Mrs. Frank Crowell
- Founded at: New York City, New York, U.S.
- Type: lineage society
- President General: Sue Bensinger Petres
- Website: nsdu.org

The National Society Daughters of the Union 1861–1865 (often abbreviated as NSDU) is an American lineage society for women who descend from Union veterans of the American Civil War.

== History ==
The National Society Daughters of the Union 1861–1865 was founded in New York City on January 9, 1912, by Mrs. Frank Crowell. She met with a group of friends in her home to organize a society honoring the memory and contributions of those who preserved the Union during the American Civil War. Mrs. John Fowler Trow served as the first parliamentarian.

The national society's first annual meeting was held on January 30, 1912, the anniversary of the day when all states that had seceded to join the Confederate States of America were reinstated into the Union. The first national board of officers was elected on January 31, 1912.

Historically, the national society provides five scholarships to Lincoln Memorial University in Harrogate, Tennessee. They also support the Hindman Settlement School in Hindman, Kentucky, and Wreaths Across America, laying wreaths on all soldiers' graves at Andersonville National Cemetery in Georgia.

By 1941, the National Society Daughters of the Union 1861–1865 had 3,000 members across 33 chapters.

On September 14, 2024, the national society recognized the Stockton House Museum, a Victorian mansion in Flint, Michigan, as a historic site and installed a historic marker.

== Membership ==
The eligibility requirements for membership into the national society indicate that a woman must be of at least eighteen years of age and be able to prove direct lineal descent or collateral descent from a man or woman who rendered military or civil service to the Union between 1861 and 1865. Junior membership is also available for girls under the age of eighteen who meet the lineage requirements.

== See also ==
- Daughters of Union Veterans of the Civil War, 1861–1865
- Sons of Union Veterans of the Civil War
- United Daughters of the Confederacy
- Sons of Confederate Veterans
