= Lothrop Memorial Building-G.A.R. Hall =

- U.S. National Register of Historic Places
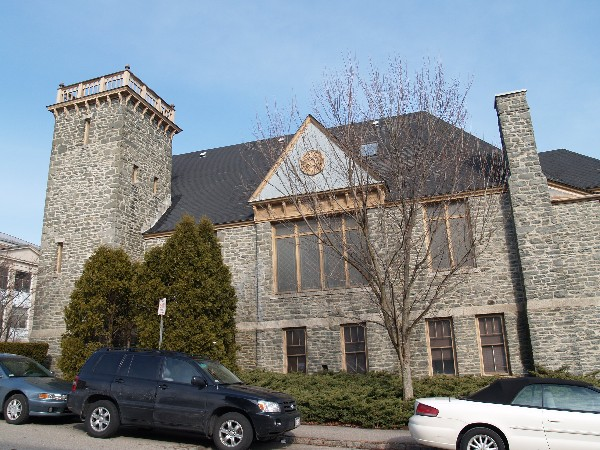

- Location within Massachusetts Location within the United States
- Location: Taunton, Massachusetts
- Coordinates: 41°54′13″N 71°6′29″W
- Built: 1888
- Architectural style: Queen Anne
- MPS: Taunton MRA
- NRHP reference No.: 84002168
- Added to NRHP: July 05, 1984

The Lothrop Memorial Building-G.A.R. Hall is an historic building located at 95 Washington Street in Taunton, Massachusetts. It was originally built in 1888 as the First Presbyterian Church, on land purchased from Marcus Morton, and now houses professional offices. It was for many years home to the William H. Bartlett GAR Post No. 3 of the Grand Army of the Republic, a veterans organization, which ran the building as a community center. It was added to the National Register of Historic Places in 1984.

== Description and history ==
Lothrop Hall is located at the northeast corner of Washington and Governor Streets, a short way north of the Taunton's center. It is a two-story fieldstone building, adorned with a variety of Queen Anne style elements, including a wood latticework screen, brackets and ornamental balustrade on top of its square tower, which projects from the right front of the west-facing front facade.

The building was erected in 1888 by the congregation of the First Presbyterian Church, on land it had purchased from Marcus Morton, a prominent local jurist. The church was dissolved in 1903 amid financial difficulties, and the building was sold to Cyrus Lothrop. He donated it to the Massachusetts Veterans of the Grand Army of the Republic (GAR), an organization of veterans of the American Civil War. It was one of 210 GAR posts in Massachusetts. The hall was used for many years as a site for social events and military remembrances. After standing vacant for some years, it was rehabilitated in 1983 for use as professional offices.

== See also ==
- National Register of Historic Places listings in Taunton, Massachusetts
