= Kent County Civil War Monument =

- U.S. National Register of Historic Places
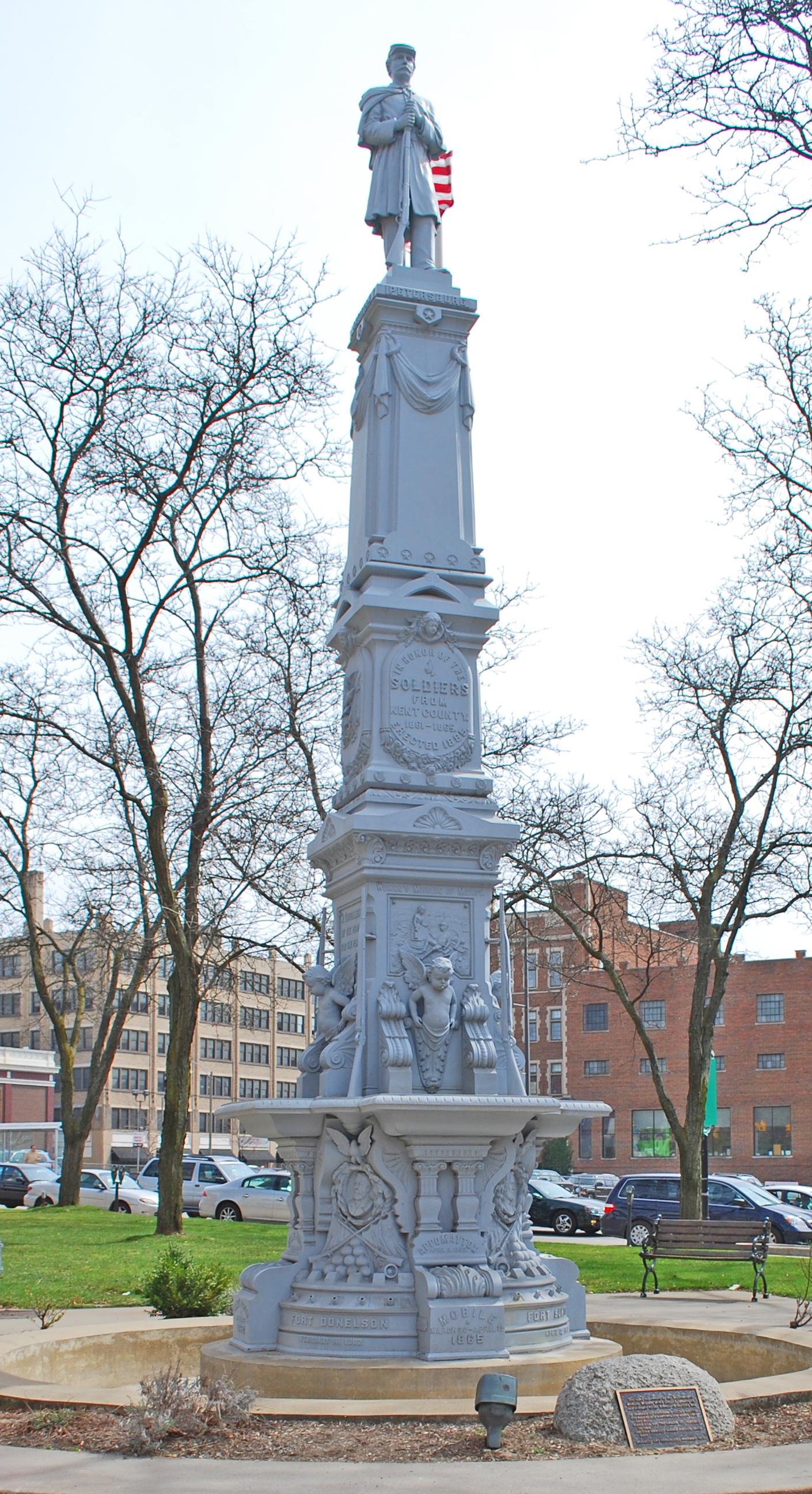
- Kent County Civil War Monument

- Location within Michigan Location within the United States
- Interactive map
- Location: Grand Rapids, Michigan
- Coordinates: 42°57′49″N 85°40′4″W
- Area: 0.2 acres (0.081 ha)
- Built: 1885
- Architect: Monumental Bronze Company
- Architectural style: cast zinc monument with fountain
- NRHP reference No.: 04000690
- Added to NRHP: July 14, 2004

The Kent County Civil War Monument is an historic landmark in Grand Rapids, Michigan. The monument is located downtown in Monument Park, bounded by Division Avenue and Monroe Avenue. It was listed on the National Register of Historic Places in 2004.

== History ==
Plans for the monument were made, and fundraising started, before the end of the American Civil War. However, the effort languished until 1884, when the upcoming Seventeenth Annual Reunion of the Society of the Army of the Cumberland generated renewed interest. More funds were raised, and the Detroit Bronze Company, a subsidiary of the Monumental Bronze Company of Bridgeport, Connecticut, was hired to create the statuary. The monument was dedicated on September 17, 1885, during the Reunion. The dedication was attended by Governor Russell A. Alger and General Philip H. Sheridan, among others. The monument was restored in 2003, and again in 2014.

== Description ==
The Kent County Civil War Monument is a thirty-four foot high monumental fountain, standing in the center of a sixteen-foot diameter basin. The monument itself has a seven-foot high base, three square upper sections above, with a Union soldier at parade rest at the top. The monument contains substantial detail, including eagles, flags, and military devices and equipment, as well as the names and dates of various Civil War battles. Detail also include portraits of Abraham Lincoln, Ulysses S. Grant, James Garfield, and Admiral David Farragut; a bas relief panel entitled "Woman's Mission of Mercy," showing a woman helping a wounded soldier; quotations from Lincoln, Grant, Garfield, and Andrew Jackson; and plaques with the Michigan state seal and Grand Army of the Republic insignia. As was typical of many such monuments, the memorial was cast in zinc. The monument was repainted blue in 1959. Fundraising for the restoration of the monument began in 2000. The required $250,000 was raised over the next three years by various organizations and community members. It was officially rededicated on October 3, 2003. Monument Park was renovated from 2013 to 2014, which led to the Civil War monument being moved slightly, and a ribbon cutting ceremony took place on October 23, 2014 to commemorate the newly revamped area.
