= Grand Army of the Republic Building (Detroit) =

- U.S. National Register of Historic Places
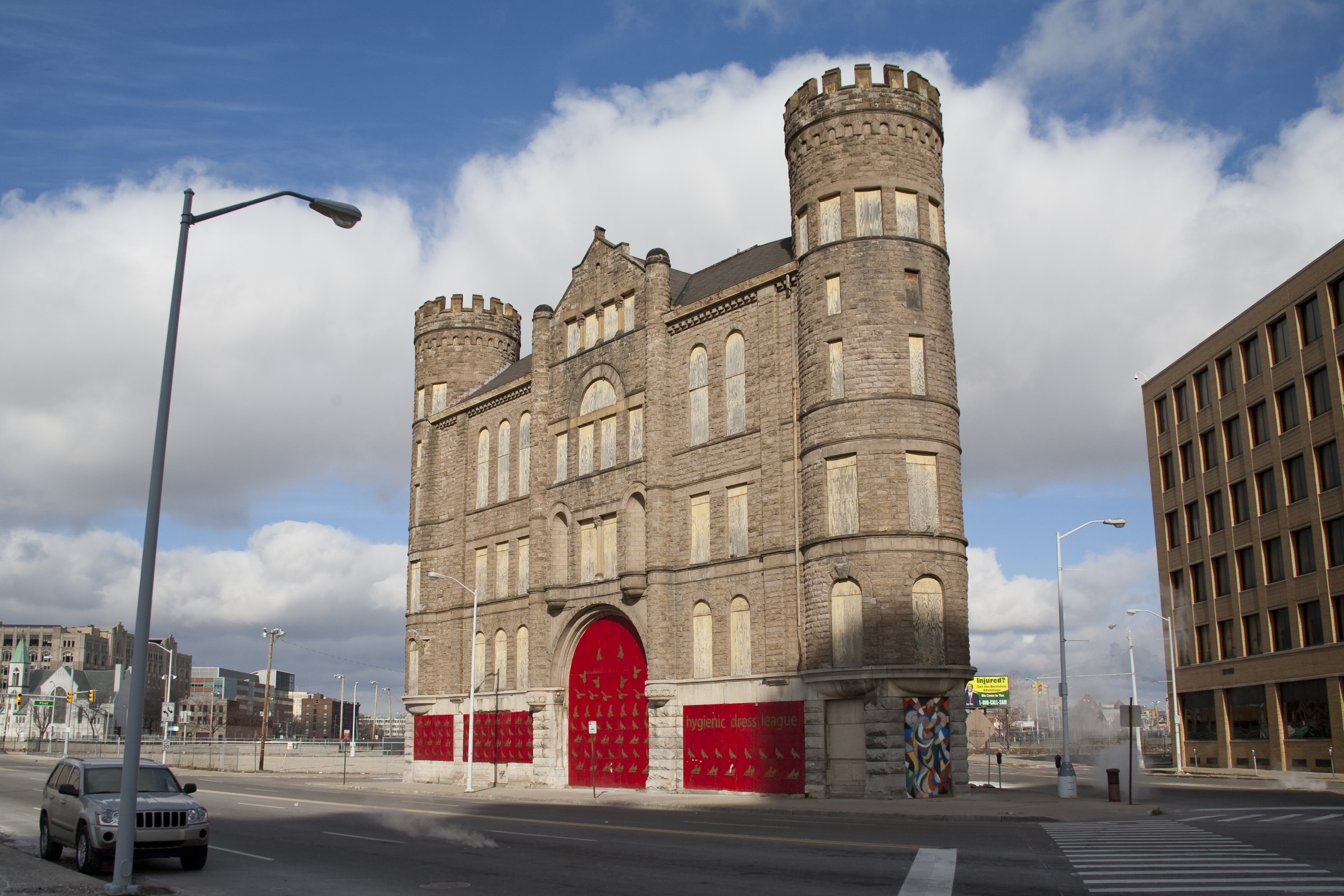
- Interactive map
- Location: 1942 West Grand River Avenue; Detroit, Michigan
- Coordinates: 42°20′6.14″N 83°3′19.2″W
- Built: 1866
- Architect: Julius Hess & Richard Raseman
- Architectural style: Richardsonian Romanesque
- NRHP reference No.: 86000262
- Added to NRHP: February 13, 1986

The Grand Army of the Republic (GAR) Building is a historic building in downtown Detroit, Michigan. It was listed on the National Register of Historic Places in 1986.

== History ==
The GAR Building was designed by architect Julius Hess, and constructed at 1942 West Grand River and Cass as an appropriate structure for meetings and other GAR related activities. The cost was split between the Grand Army of the Republic (who paid $6,000 of the cost) and the city of Detroit (who paid the remainder of the $44,000 total cost). Construction commenced in 1897 on the five-story building.

This Richardsonian Romanesque-designed building lies on a small, triangular lot on the northwest side of downtown Detroit. Originally built for the Grand Army of the Republic members in Detroit, the building included 13 shops and a bank on the ground floor, office space on the second and third floors, and a small auditorium on the fourth floor. As GAR membership dwindled through the beginning part of the 20th century, they were unable to maintain the structure and, by 1934, vacated the building and gave ownership to the city. The GAR Memorial Association, a women's group, used it until 1973. The GAR building was added to the National Register of Historic Places on February 13, 1986. More recently the city attempted to sell the building, but a coalition including the Daughters of Union Veterans of the Civil War and the Sons of Union Veterans of the Civil War brought suit against the city of Detroit to block sale of the building, claiming that a clause in the 1898 deed stated that city must preserve the building as a memorial to Civil War veterans.

== Redevelopment ==
In 2007, it was reported that the city of Detroit had sold the GAR Building to Olympia Development, an arm of Ilitch Holdings, Inc. for a price of $220,500. Olympia Development expected to renovate the building at a cost of $2 million, but the purchase was later rescinded after they did nothing with the building. In 2011, the property was then sold to Mindfield USA, a Detroit-based media company, for $220,000. The firm planned to renovate the building for its headquarters. Renovation began immediately after purchase, and Mindfield planned to occupy the top two floors of the structure, lease the ground floor for retail and a restaurant and dedicate a memorial to Civil War Veterans with renovation progress documented on a blog page.

The Republic Tavern opened in February 2015 and was named on OpenTable's Top 100 Best Restaurants For Foodies In America in September 2015 and listed on OpenTable's 100 Hottest Restaurants in America in March 2016. The Parks and Rec Diner later opened in an adjacent space, but both restaurants closed after the COVID-19 pandemic.

In February 2023, the building was sold to Barbat Holdings of West Bloomfield, Michigan, for an undisclosed price.

== See also ==
- Urban development in Detroit
