= G.A.R. Memorial Hall (Algona, Iowa) =

- U.S. National Register of Historic Places
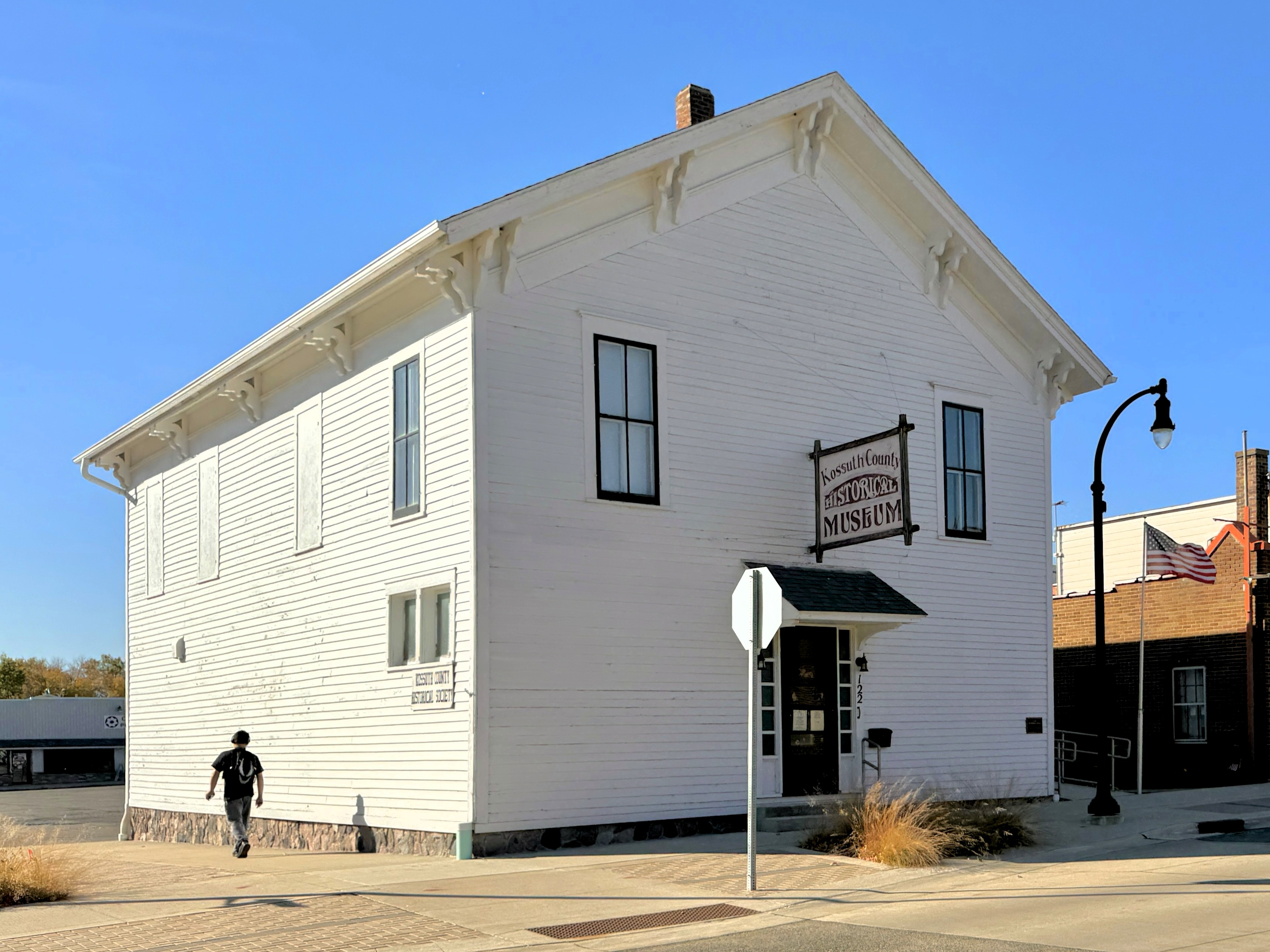
- G.A.R. Memorial Hall (Kossuth County Historical Museum) in 2024

- Location within Iowa Location within the United States
- Location: 122 S. Dodge St. Algona, Iowa
- Coordinates: 43°04′04.8″N 94°14′13″W
- Area: less than one acre
- Built: 1867
- Built by: James Henderson
- Architectural style: Italianate
- NRHP reference No.: 13001077
- Added to NRHP: January 15, 2014

G.A.R. Memorial Hall, also known as the Algona Schoolhouse, is a historic building located in Algona, Iowa, United States. It was built as the city's first schoolhouse in 1867, and moved to this location in 1887. The two-story frame Italianate structure features a gable roof, bracketed eaves, and wood lap siding. It originally had a belfry in the center of the roof, but it was removed at some point. After the building was moved it was used by the James C. Taylor Post No. 165 of the Grand Army of the Republic (G.A.R.), which had been organized in 1883. During the G.A.R.'s ownership the first floor was used as a library from 1899 to 1904. Because of declining numbers, the local G.A.R. Post gave the building to Hagg Post No. 90 of the American Legion Post in 1919 who used it for their clubhouse until 1967. At that time the Kossuth County Historical Society acquired the building, and they use it for a museum. It was listed on the National Register of Historic Places in 2014.
