= Cornwall Memorial Park =

Park in Bellingham, Washington, United States

- Cornwall Park
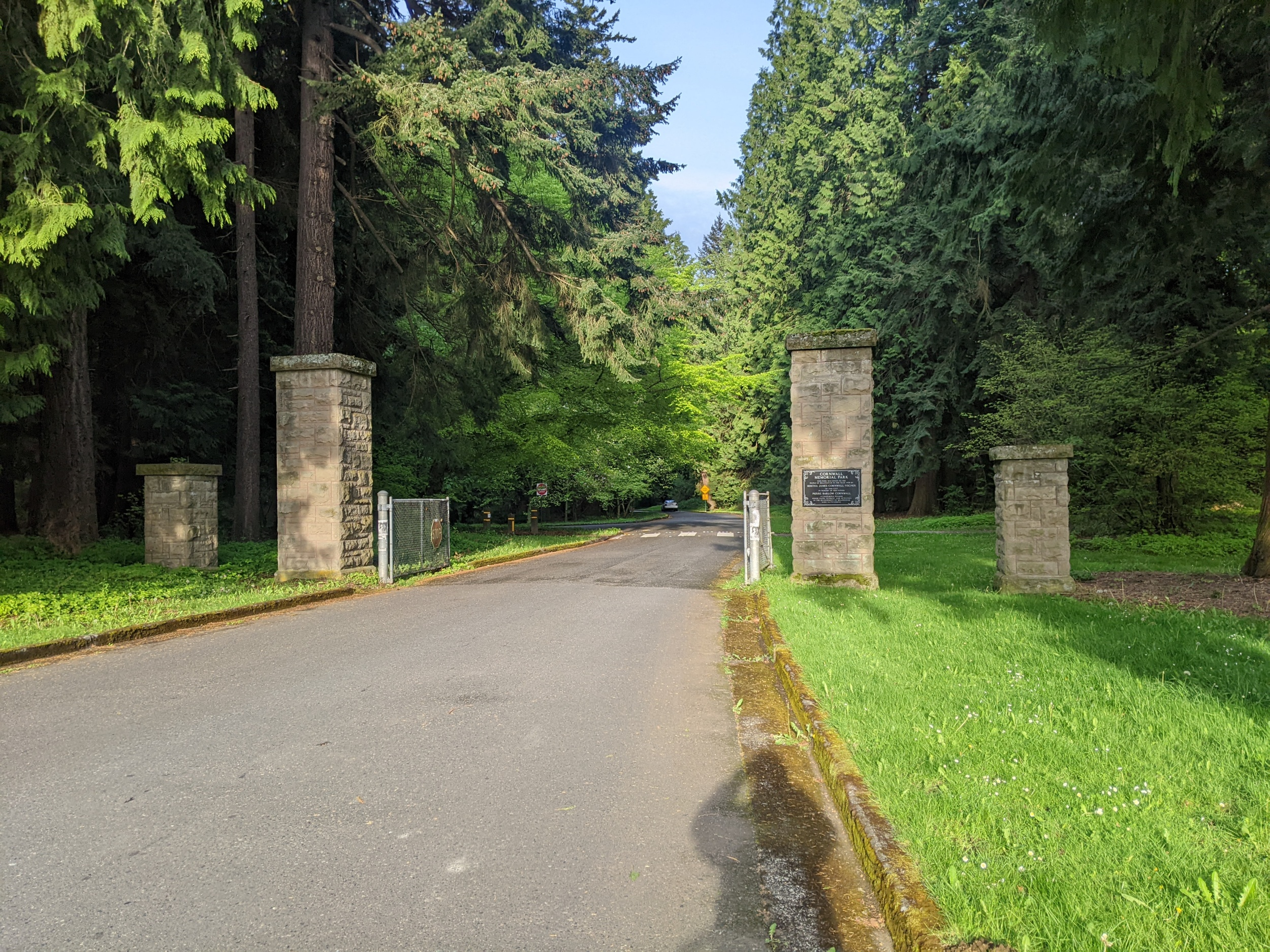
- The Meridian Street entrance gates
- Interactive map of Cornwall Memorial Park
- Type: Municipal Park and Natural Area
- Location: Bellingham, Washington, United States of America
- Coordinates: 48°46′16″N 122°28′51″W
- Area: 70 acres (0.28 km^{2})
- Established: 1909
- Manager: City of Bellingham Parks and Recreation Department
- Open: 6 am to 10 pm daily
- Hiking trails: 1.5 miles (2.4 km)
- Collections: Sylvia Grace Magnolia Collection
- Public transit: Whatcom Transportation Authority routes 5, 26, 27, and 37.
- Website: Official website

Cornwall Memorial Park, commonly known as Cornwall Park, is a 70-acre (0.28 km^{2}) park in Bellingham, Washington, United States of America.

The park gives its name to the surrounding Cornwall Park neighborhood of Bellingham, and the park itself was named for Pierre Barlow Cornwall, a San Francisco industrialist.

== Description ==
The park is largely forested, and is bisected by Squalicum Creek. There are over 1.5 miles (2.4 km) of trails through the park, as well as:

- A 9 hole disc golf course
- Horseshoe pits
- Multipurpose fields
- An outdoor basketball court
- Tennis courts
- Pickleball courts
- Two playgrounds
- A spray park
- And picnicking amenities

A collection of magnolias, called the Sylvia Grace Collection, is located within the park. The collection began in 1995 with a donation of 80 trees in 53 different varieties.

== History ==
The land of the park had been owned by the Cornwall family since 1883 with the formation of the Bellingham Bay and British Columbia Railroad, which runs through the area.

The park was established in 1909 after 65 acres (0.26 km^{2}) was donated by Bruce Cornwall and Bertha James Cornwall Fischer in honor of their father, Pierre Barlow Cornwall. The park was dedicated to the citizens of Bellingham. Little work was done on the park until 1912 when pipes for drinking water were laid and laborers cleared much of the underbrush to lay paths.

In 1920 car camping was introduced in the park, likely chasing a trend of the time. By July 1925, 806 cars camped at Cornwall Memorial Park. Car camping declined with the great depression and closed in 1927.

Only in 1922 when Bertha Fischer donated $150,000 for improvements to the park were substantial improvements actually started, including an entrance off Cornwall Street with a boulevard through the park ending at Meridian Street. The boulevard was closed in the late 1980s for safety reasons, and while much of the road remains it no longer goes through the park, only to parking areas within. In 1923 stone entrance gates were erected at each entrance, the one at the Cornwall Ave entrance dedicated in memory of Bertha Fischer.

The Works Progress Administration built much of the parks early facilities, including an area for lawn bowling. The Bellingham Lawn Bowling Club then built a clubhouse in 1938, which later became the park caretaker's residence and then from 1975 to 2017 the City of Bellingham's Parks and Recreation Administration Office. In 2017 the building was demolished. In 1938 a wading pool was installed.

In 1955 funding for a new school in the area passed. It was debated whether the land in the park should be used for a school or not, and eventually Parkview Elementary School was built on the edge of the park.

In 2018 a report was put together by the newly formed Cornwall Park Work Group, a group consisting of members of the Parks and Recreation Department, Public Works Department, police, a homeless outreach team, the Cornwall Park neighborhood association, the PTO for Bellingham School District|Parkview Elementary School, and representatives for several sports clubs that use the park. The group was put together and the report was made with the purpose of making the park safer, and make the park better.

== Memorial to the Grand Army of the Republic ==
See also List of memorials to the Grand Army of the Republic

A concrete memorial dedicated to the Grand Army of the Republic, Department of Washington and Alaska. The memorial was built in 1931 with the support of the Woman's Relief Corps, Sons of Veterans, their auxiliary, school children, and citizens of Bellingham.
