= Benjamin Franklin Stephenson =

American doctor and lineage society founder

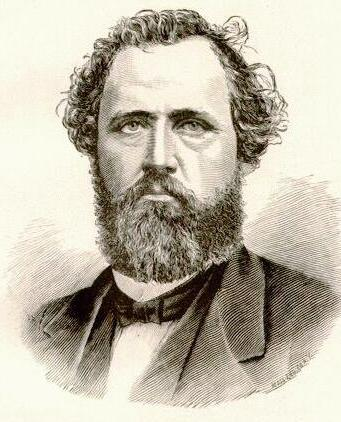

Commander-in-Chief of the Grand Army of the Republic
- In office April 6, 1866 – November 21, 1866
- Preceded by: Office established
- Succeeded by: Stephen A. Hurlbut

Personal details
- Born: October 3, 1823 Wayne County, Illinois, U.S.
- Died: August 30, 1871 (aged 47) Rock Creek, Illinois, U.S.
- Spouse: Barbara Moore
- Education: Rush Medical College
- Occupation: surgeon

Military service
- Allegiance: United States
- Branch/service: Union Army
- Years of service: 1862 – 1864
- Rank: Major
- Commands: 14th Illinois Infantry Regiment
- Battles/wars: American Civil War

Benjamin Franklin Stephenson (October 3, 1823 – August 30, 1871) was an American medical doctor and military officer. He served in the Union Army as Chief Surgeon of the 14th Illinois Infantry Regiment during the American Civil War. Following the war, he founded the Grand Army of the Republic.

== Early life and education ==
Stephenson was born on October 3, 1823, in Wayne County, Illinois. His father was from South Carolina and his mother was from North Carolina. The family moved to Sangamon County when Stephenson was around three years old. On February 7, 1850, he graduated from Rush Medical College in Chicago.

== Career ==
Upon completing his medical degree, Stephenson practiced medicine in Petersburg, Illinois. On April 7, 1862, he joined the Union Army and was commissioned as Chief Surgeon of the 14th Illinois Infantry Regiment. He served during the Civil War for two years and was commissioned as a major by Governor Richard Yates Sr. Stephenson was honorably mustered out on June 24, 1864.

Following the war, he settled in Springfield, Illinois, to continue practicing medicine and became connected with a firm of druggists.

On April 6, 1866, in Decatur, Illinois, Stephenson founded the Grand Army of the Republic, a fraternal organization for veterans of the Union Army, Union Navy, and the Marines Corps who served in the Civil War. He named the organization, wrote its constitution, and created it's motto: Fraternity, Charity, and Loyalty.

== Death and legacy ==
Stephenson died on August 30, 1871. He was buried at Rose Hill Cemetery in Petersburg, Illinois.

A memorial dedicated to Stephenson, the Stephenson Grand Army of the Republic Memorial in Washington, D.C., was built in his honor in 1909.

The Dr. Benjamin Franklin Stephenson Library and Research Center at the headquarters of the Daughters of Union Veterans of the Civil War, 1861–1865 in Springfield was named in his honor.
