= Sunfield G. A. R. Hall =

- Sunfield Grand Army of the Republic Post No. 283 Hall
- U.S. National Register of Historic Places
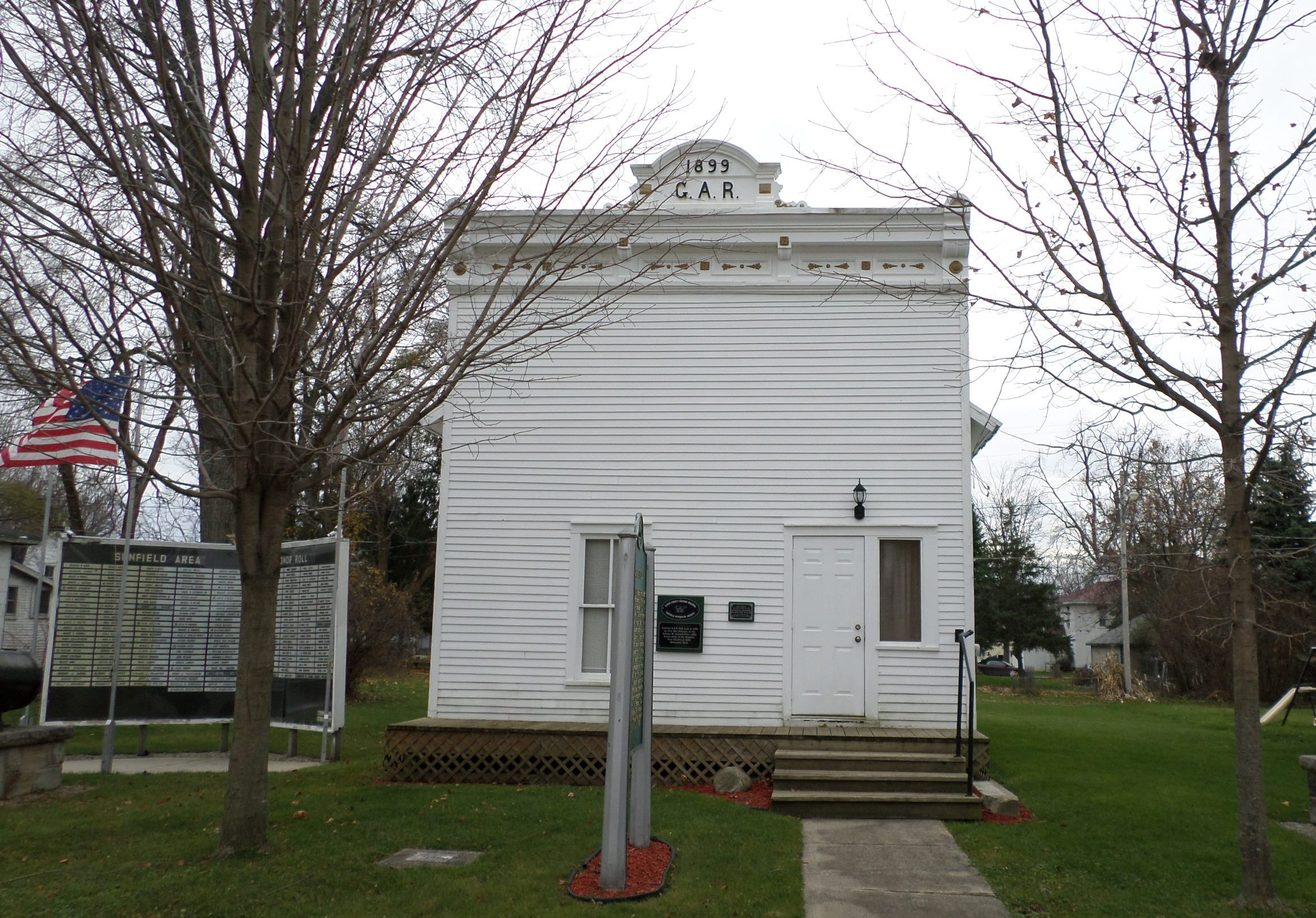

- Location within Michigan Location within the United States
- Interactive map
- Location: 115 Main St., Sunfield, Michigan
- Coordinates: 42°45′43″N 84°59′39″W
- Area: less than one acre
- Built: 1899
- Architectural style: Late Victorian
- NRHP reference No.: 92001502
- Added to NRHP: October 29, 1992

The Sunfield G. A. R. Hall, also known as the Sunfield Grand Army of the Republic Post No. 283 Hall, is a hall built for the Grand Army of the Republic fraternal organization, located at 115 Main Street in Sunfield, Michigan. It was listed on the National Register of Historic Places in 1992. The building has been in continuous use by organizations of descendants of Civil War veterans since its construction.

== History ==
The Grand Army of the Republic was organized in 1866 as a fraternal organization for Union veterans of the |Civil War. Although a Michigan section was initially organized in 1867, it became inactive, and was reorganized in 1879. However, the organization quickly caught on in the state, with nearly 400 posts formed over the next 15 years. This included the Samuel W. Grinnell Post No. 283, chartered in Sunfield on October 6, 1884. The post was named after Sergeant Samuel W. Grinnell, who had died in 1883. Grinnell had seen action in the Battle of Shiloh, and later served as Sunfield's village clerk, treasurer and as a justice of the peace.

The post first met in a private home, then in a room above a local blacksmith shop, then later at the Sunfield Odd Fellows Hall. By 1898, the membership had grown to 32, and the post decided to construct their own hall. Land was purchased, and in 1899 work began constructing this building. The building was dedicated on September 15, 1899. Later that year, two cannon captured in the Spanish–American War were put in place. The building continued to be used by the post through the first three decades of the twentieth century. However, by 1929, only two members remained, and the last member died in 1934.

However, other organizations consisting of decedents of Civil War veterans have used and maintained the hall. Among these were the Women's Relief Corps #62, who used the building from 1899 to 1925 and the Samuel W. Grinnell Camp #17, Sons of Union Veterans, from 1918 to 1936. The Helen M. Edwins Tent #30, Daughters of Union Veterans of the Civil War, began using the hall in 1926, and (as of the 1980s) owned the property. the Curtenius Guard Camp #17, Sons of Union Veterans of the Civil War, began using the hall in 1983, and continue to meet there.

== Description ==
The Sunfield G. A. R. Hall is a rectangular, single story, front-gable, clapboarded building, with a false front topped by a pressed metal cornice. Atop the cornice is a plaque with the building's construction date, 1899, and the initials G. A. R. The building has a metal roof and fieldstone foundation. The front and side walls of the hall contain two-over-two windows in plain board frames. Two cannon sit in front of the building.

On the interior, the building is divided into three rooms: a small entry vestibule, the nearby cloakroom, and the main hall. A door with peephole separates the vestibule from the main hall. The main hall remains largely as furnished by the original members of the G. A. R. post, including members' chairs, weapons and medals and flags and other effects.
