= Daughters of Union Veterans of the Civil War National Headquarters and Museum =

History museum and library in Springfield, Illinois

- Established: 1969
- Location: 503 South Walnut Street; Springfield, Illinois, U.S.
- Type: History museum Library
- Director: Linda Holzhausen
- President: Carol Comp
- Website: duvcw.org/headquarters

The Daughters of Union Veterans of the Civil War National Headquarters and Museum is the national headquarters of the Daughters of Union Veterans of the Civil War, 1861–1865, located in Springfield, Illinois. It consists of two buildings, the Daughters of Union Veterans of the Civil War Museum and the Dr. Benjamin Franklin Stephenson Library and Research Center.

== Headquarters ==
The National Headquarters of the Daughters of Union Veterans of the Civil War, 1861–1865 is located at 503 South Walnut Street in Springfield, Illinois. There are two buildings on the site, the Daughters of Union Veterans Civil War Museum and the Dr. Benjamin Franklin Stephenson Library and Research Center. The organization built a memorial brick garden on the grounds in 2010, featuring memorial bricks to honor the Daughters of Union Veterans' founders and members, as well as Civil War veterans and American veterans from all wars.

=== Museum ===
The Daughters of Union Veterans of the Civil War Museum was built by the organization in 1969.

The museum's collection includes artifacts from the Civil War including rifles, medals, photographs, money, uniforms, drums, and letters from soldiers. The museum houses a gift shop, where the general public can purchase history books and Civil War memorabilia. Admission to the museum is free.

=== Library ===
The Dr. Benjamin Franklin Stephenson Library and Research Center is housed in 2,800-square-foot American foursquare house that was built in 1898. It was acquired by the Daughters of Union Veterans of the Civil War, 1861–1865 as part of their national headquarters and is located next to their Civil War Museum. They dedicated the library to Benjamin Franklin Stephenson, a Union Army surgeon who founded the Grand Army of the Republic.

The library houses a complete set of War of the Rebellion: Official Records of the Union and Confederate Armies and many other volumes that are available to the public for on-site research. Admission to the library is free.
