= Sunfield =

Sunfield can refer to a community in the United States:

- The village of Sunfield, Michigan
- Sunfield Township, Michigan
