= Stephenson Grand Army of the Republic Memorial =

Public artwork by J. Massey Rhind

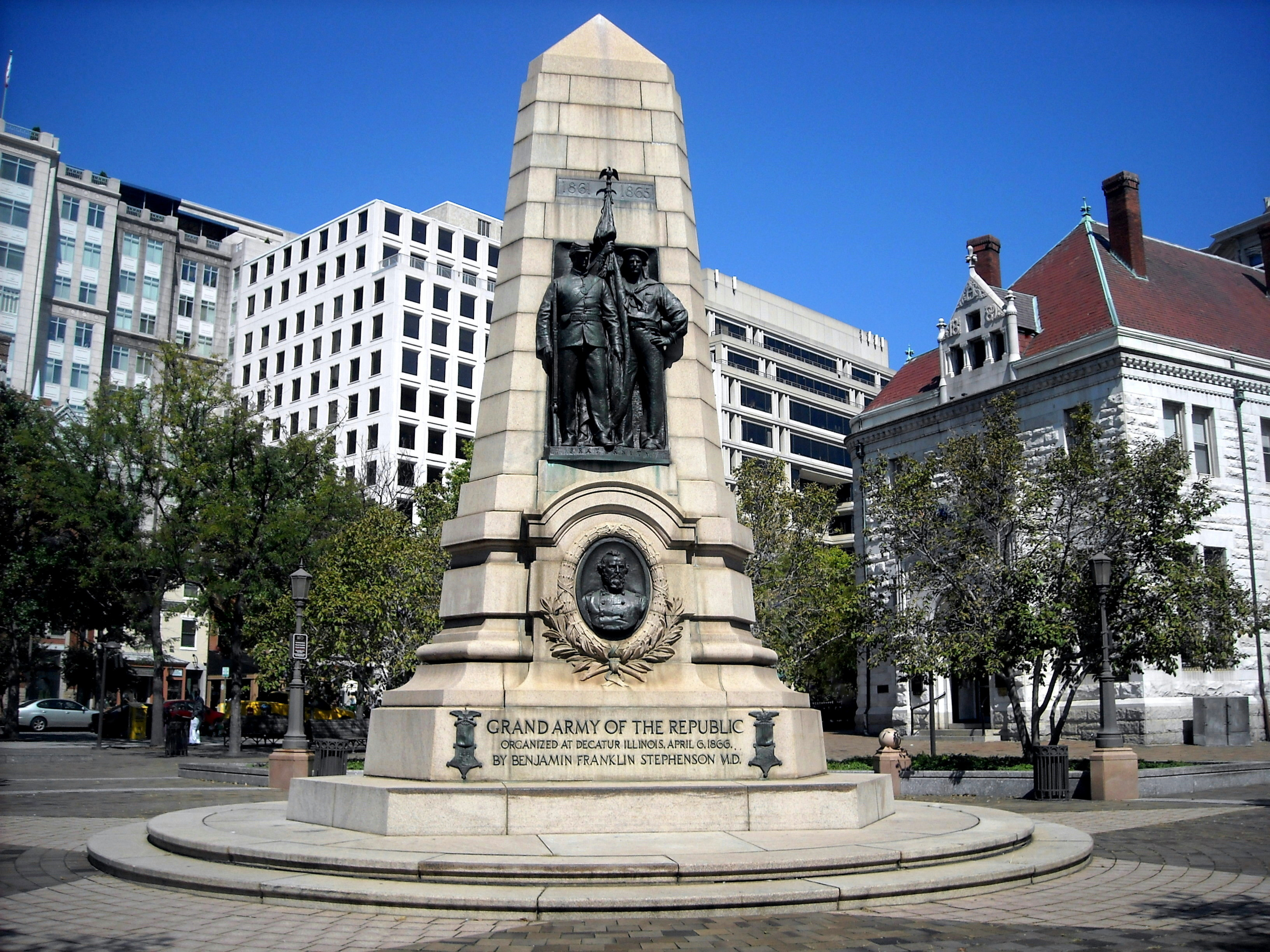
- Interactive map of Stephenson Grand Army of the Republic Memorial
- Location: Indiana Plaza, Washington, D.C., United States
- Designer: J. Massey Rhind (sculptor); Rankin, Kellogg & Crane (architects); Roman Bronze Works (founder); William Gray & Sons, P. R. Pullman and Company (contractors)
- Material: bronze (sculpture) granite (shaft) concrete (base)
- Height: 25 feet (7.6 m) (shaft); 2 feet (0.61 m) (base)
- Opening date: July 3, 1909
- Dedicated to: Benjamin F. Stephenson
- Stephenson Grand Army of the Republic Memorial
- U.S. National Register of Historic Places
- U.S. Historic district – Contributing property
- Location within Washington, D.C.
- Coordinates: 38°53′36.9″N 77°1′17.7″W
- Part of: Civil War Monuments in Washington, D.C.
- NRHP reference No.: 78000257
- Added to NRHP: September 20, 1978

The Stephenson Grand Army of the Republic Memorial, also known as Dr. Benjamin F. Stephenson, is a public artwork in Washington, D.C. honoring Benjamin Franklin Stephenson, founder of the Grand Army of the Republic, a fraternal organization for Union veterans. The memorial is sited at Indiana Plaza, located at the intersection of 7th Street, Indiana Avenue, and Pennsylvania Avenue NW in the Penn Quarter neighborhood. The bronze figures were sculpted by J. Massey Rhind, a prominent 20th-century artist. Attendees at the 1909 dedication ceremony included President William Howard Taft, Senator William Warner, and hundreds of Union veterans.

The memorial is one of eighteen Civil War monuments in Washington, D.C., which were collectively listed on the National Register of Historic Places in 1978. The bronze sculptures of Stephenson and allegorical figures are displayed on a triangular granite shaft surmounting a concrete base. The memorial is owned and maintained by the National Park Service, a federal agency of the Interior Department.

== History ==
=== Background ===
Benjamin F. Stephenson (1823–1871) was a graduate of Rush Medical College who practiced medicine in Petersburg, Illinois. When the Civil War began in 1861, he was appointed surgeon of the 14th Illinois Volunteer Infantry Regiment. Eventually, he achieved the rank of major. Following his honorable discharge in 1864, Stephenson began practicing medicine in Springfield, Illinois, and soon began plans for a national association of Union veterans. He named the new organization the Grand Army of the Republic (GAR), wrote the GAR's constitution and adopted the GAR motto "Fraternity, Charity, and Loyalty". The organization would be open to all Union soldiers and sailors who were honorably discharged. Stephenson found a lack of enthusiasm for the GAR among Springfield veterans, so he chose nearby Decatur to establish Post No. 1, Decatur, Department of Illinois, Grand Army of the Republic, on April 6, 1866. The date was the fourth anniversary of the Battle of Shiloh where he and most of the other charter members had taken part. After the GAR began to attract new members, Stephenson was relegated to adjutant general and spent most of his time attending to routine duties. At the time of his death in 1871, Stephenson's medical practice was failing, and he felt the GAR would never succeed.

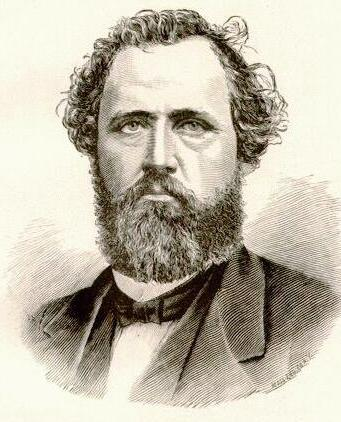
Benjamin F. Stephenson

Following Stephenson's death, the GAR grew from a charitable organization for Union widows and wounded veterans to the country's most powerful single-issue political group in the late 19th century. It was the nation's first veterans association open to both officers and enlisted men, and membership grew to over 400,000. The GAR was responsible for securing large pensions for veterans and members played an active role in the election of six Union veterans as U.S. president. In the early 20th century, GAR membership declined as veterans died of old age, and organization leaders began plans to memorialize them and the GAR itself. To honor the group's founder, the GAR, at the behest of General Charles Partridge and the National Tribune, raised $35,000 from its members to erect a memorial for Stephenson. Congress appropriated an additional $10,000 on March 4, 1907.

GAR leaders had specific plans for the memorial, which left little leeway for artist creativity. They wanted a tall, triangular granite shaft with three figures representing the organization's motto. J. Massey Rhind (1860–1936), a Scottish-American sculptor who immigrated to the United States in 1889, was chosen for the project. At the time, he was considered one of the country's best architectural sculptors known for the large Soldiers and Sailors Monument in Syracuse, New York. The architectural firm Rankin, Kellogg & Crane was chosen to design the central shaft of the memorial, and the reliefs were founded by Roman Bronze Works. William Gray & Sons performed contracting duties for the memorial, and P. R. Pullman and Company was chosen as the contractor for the foundation.

A resolution passed by the Senate in April 1902 provided the memorial to be erected on any of the city's public lands other than the Library of Congress and Capitol grounds. The site chosen, at the corner of 7th Street and Louisiana Avenue (now Indiana Avenue) NW, was selected by a commission appointed by Congress. The commission consisted of Secretary of War Jacob M. Dickinson, Senator George P. Wetmore, Representative Samuel W. McCall, General Louis Wagner, and Thomas S. Hopkins. The soil at the chosen site, present-day Indiana Plaza, could not support the memorial's weight, so the concrete foundation had to be expanded.

=== Dedication ===
The Stephenson memorial was formally dedicated at 2:30 pm on July 3, 1909. Hundreds of elderly veterans attended the event, many wearing their military uniforms. Prominent attendees included President William Howard Taft and Senator William Warner. Following the invocation, GAR commander-in-chief Colonel Henry M. Nevius gave an impassioned speech about the sacrifices made by Union forces during the Civil War. He said by the shedding of their blood, "the flag of the United States has been raised from the dust and mire, smoke begrimed, powder stained and bullet ridden and thrown to the breeze to float forever over our broad land of the free."

Taft paid tribute to the sacrifices made by veterans and accepted the memorial on behalf of the American people. Following his speech, Warner told the crowd: "Boys, the President of the United States talks like a comrade. Get up on your feet, all of you, now three cheers for the President of the United States." The president and Rhind, who was introduced to the crowd, were both cheered. After the ceremony, the Marine Band played "Tenting on the Old Camp Ground" as the veterans sang. Brigadier General William Wallace Wotherspoon served as the grand marshal of a military parade that marched from City Hall, past the memorial, west on Pennsylvania Avenue to the Treasury Building, and ended at 15th Street and New York Avenue.

=== Later history ===
In 1987, the Pennsylvania Avenue Development Corporation created Indiana Plaza by closing a portion of C Street, decreasing the width of Indiana Avenue, and adding landscaping. The process required relocating the memorial and nearby Temperance Fountain. The Stephenson memorial is now visible at the terminus of C Street. The fountain now stands where the Stephens memorial was previously located.

The memorial is one of eighteen Civil War monuments in Washington, D.C., which were collectively listed on the National Register of Historic Places on September 20, 1978, and the District of Columbia Inventory of Historic Sites on March 3, 1979. It is also designated a contributing property to the Pennsylvania Avenue National Historic Site, established on September 30, 1965. The memorial and surrounding plaza are owned and maintained by the National Park Service, a federal agency of the Interior Department.

== Design and location ==
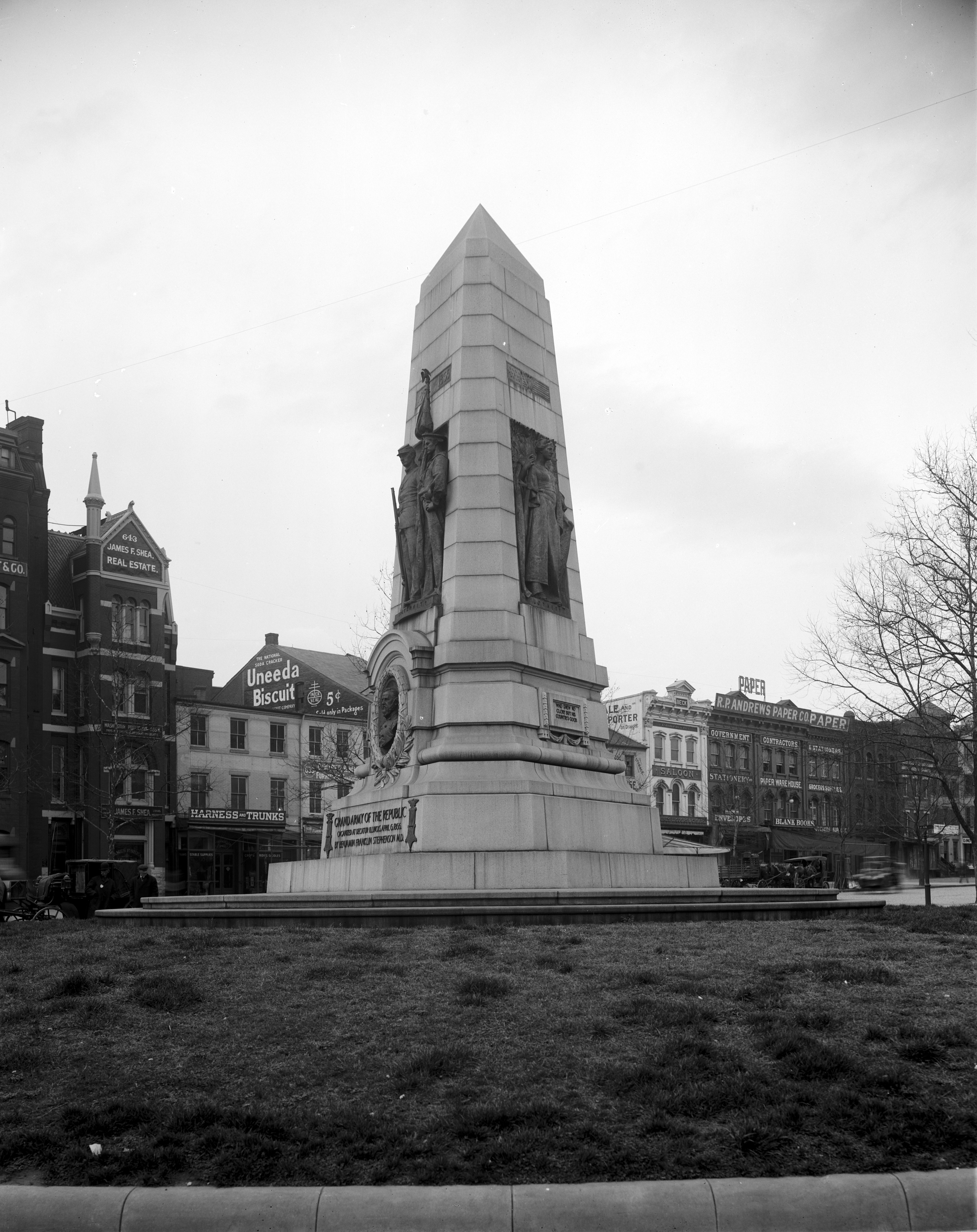
Stephenson Grand Army of the Republic Memorial circa 1910s

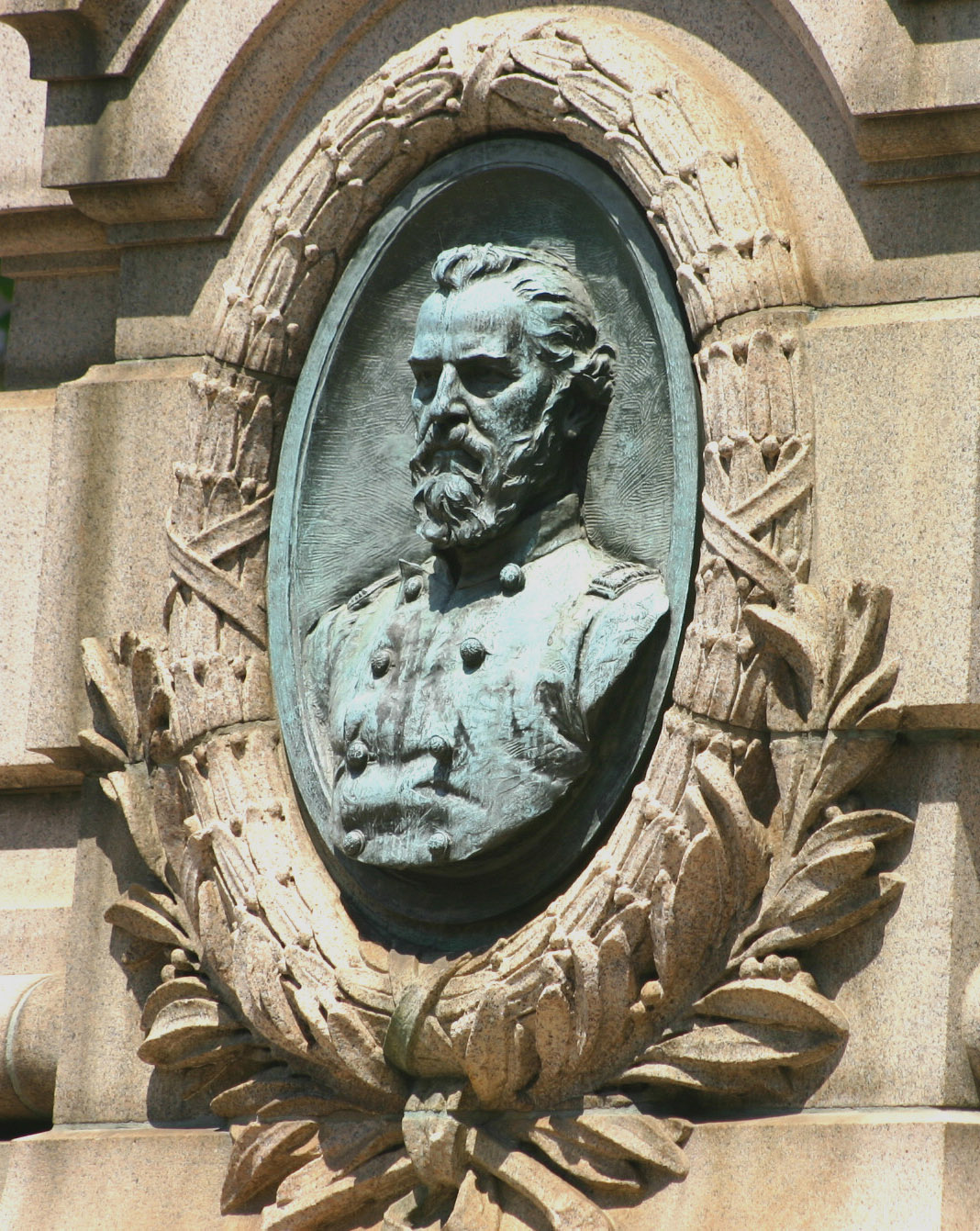
Relief bust of Stephenson

The memorial is located at Indiana Plaza (Reservation 36A) in the Penn Quarter neighborhood. The small public plaza, located across the street from the Archives Metro station, is bounded by 7th Street to the west, Indiana Avenue to the north, and Pennsylvania Avenue to the south. Two historic buildings bound the east side of the plaza: Central National Bank and National Bank of Washington, Washington Branch. Sited directly to the north of the memorial is the historic Temperance Fountain. The memorial is sited within a circular plaza and surrounded by magnolia trees and ivy. Decorative lampposts are located at the three entrances.

The triangular shaft, consisting of granite blocks, is 25 ft (7.6 m) tall and surmounts a 2 ft (0.61 m) concrete base. On each side of the shaft is a bronze relief. On the front (west) side is a relief of a Union soldier and Union sailor symbolizing Fraternity. The soldier is holding a gun with his right hand, and to his left, the sailor holds the American flag with his right hand. The word FRATERNITY is located on the bottom of the relief. Below the Fraternity relief is a relief bust of Stephenson dressed in military uniform. The bust is displayed on a bronze medallion installed in a circular niche decorated with foliage. Below the Stephenson relief is an inscription flanked by Grand Army of the Republic emblems. On the northeast side of the memorial, the relief depicts a woman cloaked in a long robe and cape protecting a small child standing to her left. She touches the child's shoulder with her left hand, and the word CHARITY is on the bottom of the relief. A woman holding a shield and drawn sword is on the southeast side of the memorial. The word LOYALTY is located on the bottom of the relief.

Inscriptions on the memorial include the following:

- 1861 1865 (upper portion of shaft, above the Union soldier and sailor relief)
- FRATERNITY (on relief, below the soldier and sailor)
- GRAND ARMY OF THE REPUBLIC / ORGANIZED AT DECATUR ILLINOIS, APRIL 6, 1866 / BY BENJAMIN FRANKLIN STEPHENSON M.D. (lower portion of the shaft, below the Stephenson relief)
- CHARITY (on relief, below the Charity figure)
- THE GREATEST / OF THESE IS / CHARITY (lower portion of the shaft, below the Charity relief)
- LOYALTY (on relief, below the Loyalty figure)
- WHO KNEW NO / GLORY BUT HIS / COUNTRY'S GOOD (lower portion of the shaft, below the Loyalty relief)

== See also ==
- List of public art in Washington, D.C., Ward 6
- Outdoor sculpture in Washington, D.C.
