= Daughters of Union Veterans of the Civil War, 1861–1865 =

American lineage society

- Abbreviation: DUVCW
- Established: December 12, 1885; 140 years ago
- Founders: Olive Howard; Minnie King; Harriet Knapp; Bertha Martin; Amy Merrill; Eva Merwin
- Founded at: 419 First Street; Massillon, Ohio, U.S.
- Type: lineage society
- Headquarters: Daughters of Union Veterans of the Civil War National Headquarters and Museum; 503 South Walnut Street; Springfield, Illinois, U.S.
- Members: 4,000
- President: Carol Comp
- Publication: National General Orders
- Website: duvcw.org

The Daughters of Union Veterans of the Civil War, 1861–1865 (often abbreviated as DUVCW) is a patriotic lineage society for women who descend from a Union patriot of the American Civil War. The society began as a women's auxiliary of the Sons of Union Veterans of the Civil War.

== History ==
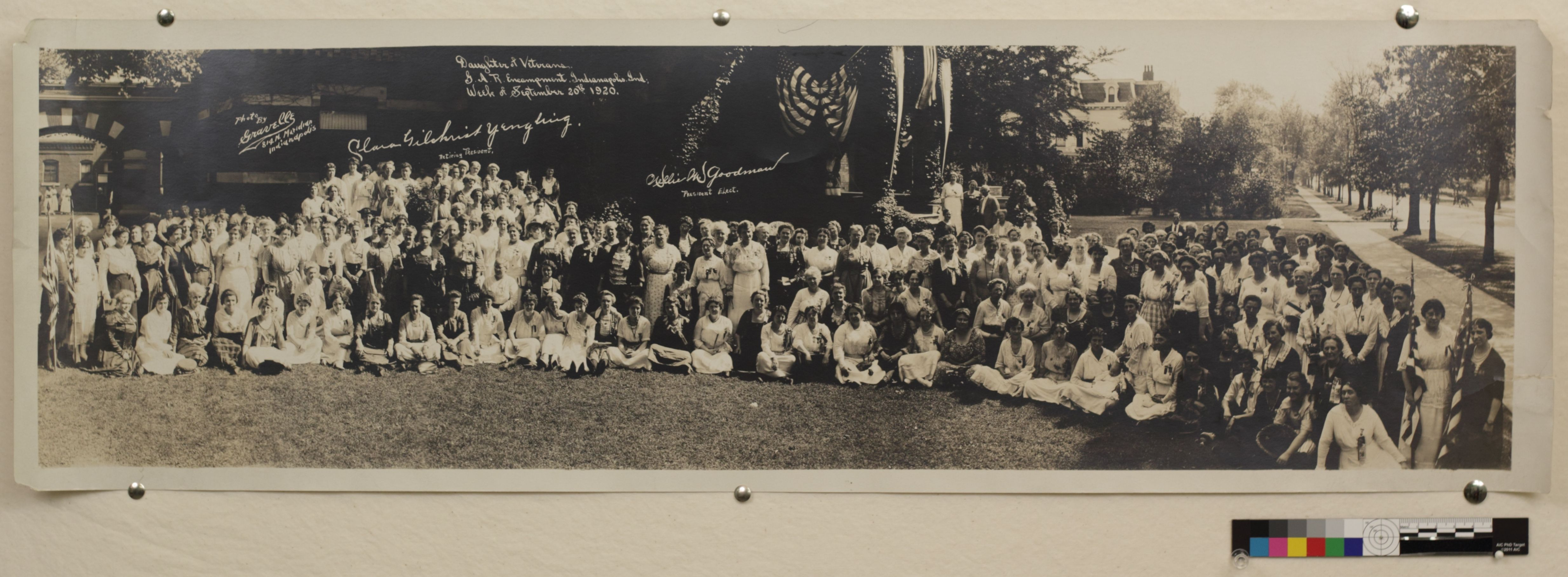
Daughters of Veterans in 1920

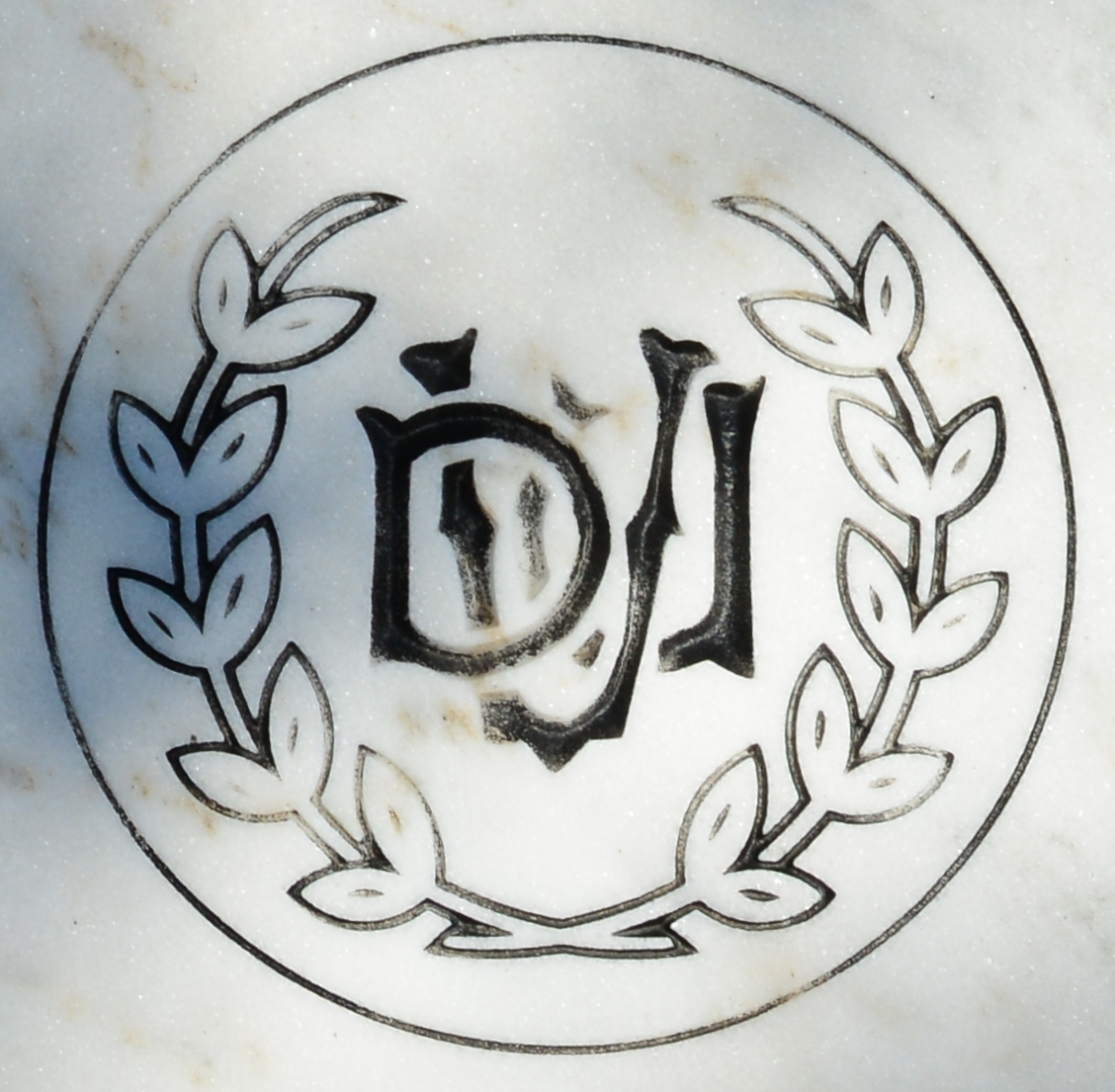
A pre-1925 logo of the Daughters of Union Veterans

The Daughters of Union Veterans of the Civil War, 1861–1865 was founded on May 30, 1885 by Olive Howard, Harriet Knapp, Eva Merwin, Frank Merwin, and Bertha Martin and the first meeting took place on June 3, 1885 at the Merwin family home, 419 First Street in Massillon, Ohio.

The society was first incorporated on December 12, 1885, as the National Alliance of the Daughters of Veterans of the United States of America, in Massillon, Ohio, and the signers of the original Articles of Incorporation were Minnie F. King, Bertha M. Martin, Olive F. Howard, Eva Merwin, and Amy Merrill. In 1900, they were endorsed by the Grand Army of the Republic at its 34th annual encampment in Chicago. The auxiliary changed their name to Daughters of Union Veterans of the Civil War at their 35th national convention in Grand Rapids, Michigan, in 1925. In 1944, they changed their name to Daughters of Union Veterans of the Civil War 1861–1865 at their convention in Des Moines, Iowa.

In the 1950s, the national organization relocated to Springfield, Illinois. In 1969, a facility was built to house their national headquarters and a Civil War museum. Located next to the Daughters of Union Veterans of the Civil War Museum is the Dr. Benjamin Franklin Stephenson Library and Research Center, housed in a 2,800-square foot American Foursquare house from 1898. The library houses a complete set of War of the Rebellion: Official Records of the Union and Confederate Armies. In 2010, a memorial brick garden was dedicated at the national headquarters to honor society founders, society members, Civil War veterans, and American veterans of all wars.

The society supports academic scholarships and projects that preserve and maintain history and the legacy of Union soldiers of the Civil War, including maintenance of historic monuments, battlefields, sites, and cemeteries as well as volunteering with veterans and veteran hospitals.

== Membership ==
Membership is based on eligibility and is limited to daughters, granddaughters, and great-granddaughters of any generation through lineal descent of a Union veteran. Members must be at least eight years old. There are approximately 4,000 members.

=== Notable members ===
- Denise Doring VanBuren, 45th President General of the Daughters of the American Revolution

== Museums and memorials ==
- Abraham Lincoln Statue and Park
- Camp Harlan-Camp McKean Historic District
- Daughters of Union Veterans Civil War Memorial
- Daughters of Union Veterans of the Civil War National Headquarters and Museum
- Grand Army of the Republic Cemetery
- Soldiers and Sailors Monument
- Sunfield G. A. R. Hall

== See also ==
- National Society Daughters of the Union 1861–1865
- Sons of Union Veterans of the Civil War
- United Daughters of the Confederacy
- Sons of Confederate Veterans
