= Lelia P. Roby =

American philanthropist

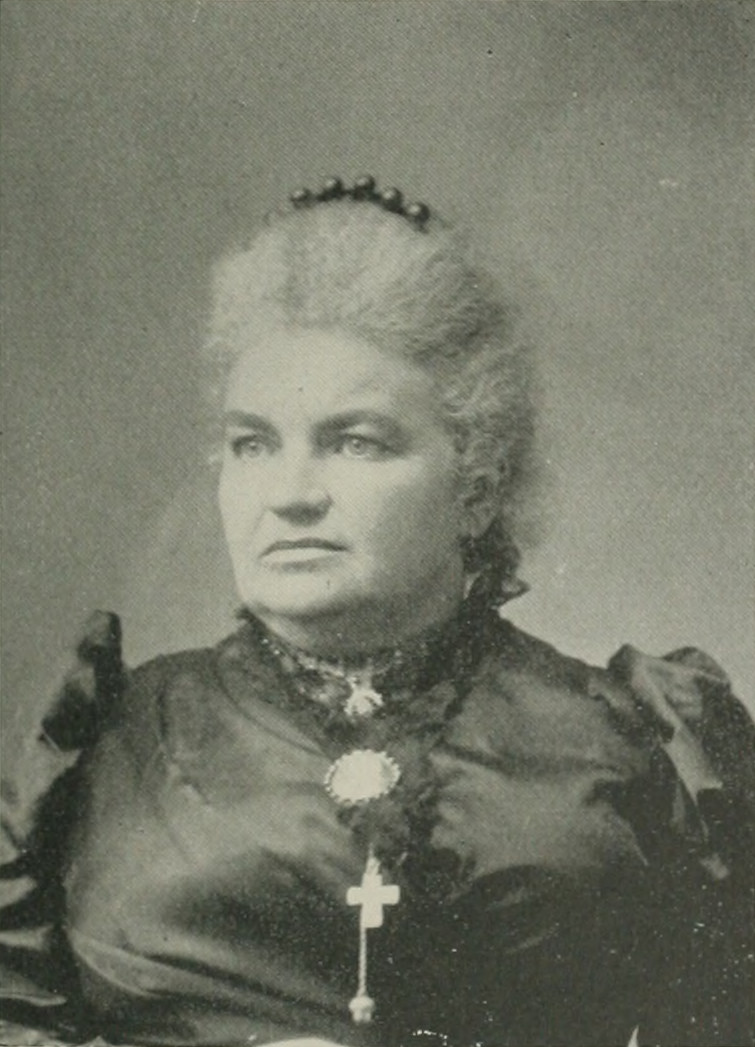
- "A Woman of the Century"
- Born: Lelia P. Foster; December 25, 1848; Boston, Massachusetts, U.S.
- Died: September 18, 1910 (aged 61); South Chicago, Illinois, U.S.
- Other name: "Miles Standish"
- Occupations: philanthropist; organizational founder; writer
- Known for: founder, Ladies of the Grand Army of the Republic.
- Notable work: Heart Beats of the Republic

Lelia P. Roby (née, Foster; pen name, Miles Standish; December 25, 1848 – September 18, 1910) was an American philanthropist of the long nineteenth century. She was the founder of the Ladies of the Grand Army of the Republic. Thoroughly educated, she was a connoisseur in architecture and art, a linguist, and a well-read lawyer. She did a good deal of literary work under the pen-name "Miles Standish".

== Early life ==
Lelia P. Foster was born in Boston, Massachusetts, December 25, 1848. Her parents were Captain Thomas Foster, of Plymouth, Massachusetts, and Catherine (Fenn) Foster. Her father and grandfather were clergymen and anti-slavery agitators. She was descended from Priscilla Mullens and John Alden, of the Mayflower Colony. Among her ancestors were many Revolutionary soldiers.

== Career ==
Roby always felt a deep interest in the soldiers who fought in the Civil War. She was a regent of the Daughters of the American Revolution (DAR).

On June 12, 1886, in Chicago, Illinois, where she lived, she founded the order of the Ladies of the Grand Army of the Republic, which started with 25 members, and by 1893, numbered about 15,000 mothers, wives, sisters and daughters of soldiers and sailors who served in the civil war of 1861–65. The members of that order pledged to assist the Grand Army of the Republic in works of charity, to extend needful aid to members in sickness and distress, to aid sick soldiers, sailors and marines, to look after soldiers' orphan's homes, to see that the children obtained proper situations when they left the homes, to watch the schools, and see to it that the children received proper education in the history of the country and in patriotism. She secured many pensions for soldiers and in countless ways worked for the good of the survivors of the war. Her activities covered a wide range. She had the care and oversight of supplying the soldiers' homes with books, magazines and periodicals; she visited the homes in various parts of the country and looked after the comfort of the old soldiers, and if there were special legislation needed to right their wrongs or give them additional comforts, she went to the State legislatures or to Washington, D.C. to secure such enactment. Through her efforts, a memorial day was set apart in the schools for the reading of histories and stories of the civil war in preparation for Decoration Day itself.

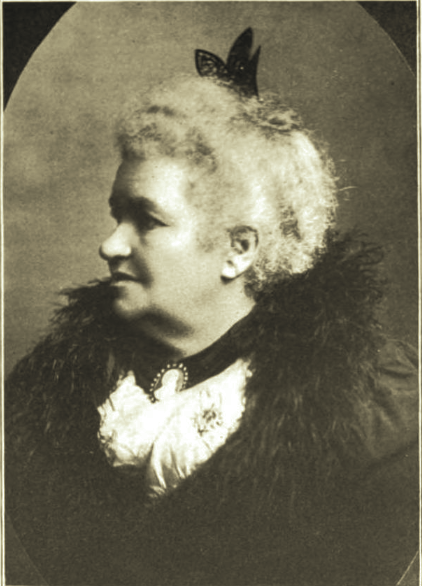
(1903)

She was one of four women selected by the Chicago Board of Education to represent them before the legislature of the State to help pass the compulsory education bill. It was passed, for a large majority of the legislators were old soldiers, and the fact that Roby was their friend made voting for a measure she advocated an acceptable duty.

She was the only woman member of the Lincoln Guard of Honor of Springfield, Illinois, and an honorary-member of the Lincoln Guard of Honor of California, an honor conferred on her "for her many acts of devotion to his memory," through Gen. William Tecumseh Sherman.

She was a member of the Chicago Academy of Science; member, Nineteenth Illinois Veteran Volunteer Infantry; member, Society for the Advancement of Women; and member, American Society of Authors. She also served as president, South Side Study Club of Chicago; and vice-president, Woman's National Press Association of Washington for Illinois.

Roby did a good deal of literary work under the pen-name "Miles Standish". She published a large volume entitled Heart Beats of the Republic.

== Personal life ==
She married General Edward Roby, a constitutional lawyer of Chicago. They had two sons, Edward and Charles.

After an illness of six months, Lelia Roby died at her residence in South Chicago, Illinois, September 18, 1910.

== Selected works ==
- Heart Beats of the Republic
