= National Memorial Association =

20th-century American organization

The National Memorial Association was an organization dedicated to the creation of a memorial to African American soldiers in the United States. It was founded in 1915 by the Committee of Colored Citizens.

== Background and founding ==
The Committee of Colored Citizens was an internal committee of the Grand Army of the Republic, the primary organization for Union veterans of the American Civil War. It was established in 1915 after fifty years of African American veterans being excluded from many veteran activities.

Shortly after the committee's establishment, they began raising money to form the National Memorial Association, which would dedicate itself to the creation of a national memorial to African American soldiers Not all members of the committee were in support of this idea, with one member claiming that "nine-tenths of the intelligent portion of the committee are utterly opposed to this movement." Regardless of this opposition, the National Memorial Association was formally incorporated on March 9, 1916, in Washington, D.C. The Association was sanctioned by the Potomac chapter of the Grand Army of the Republic. It was incorporated under the lengthy title of "National Memorial Association for the Erection of a Monument at the National Capital in Honor of the Negro Soldiers and Sailors who Fought in the Wars of Our Country."

== Activities ==
Run out of the Nineteenth Street Baptist Church, the organization initially targeted legislators, urging them to support the Association's efforts and to introduce legislation to create a memorial. The group quickly faced opposition, with Arkansas Representative Thaddeus H. Caraway introducing a bill to ban African Americans from enlisting in the military entirely.

Missouri Representative Leonidas C. Dyer and New York Representative George Murray Hulbert, alongside Secretary of War Newton D. Baker, were the Association's earliest allies within the government. In December 1916, Dyer introduced the first piece of legislation to create a national memorial for African American soldiers. While his bill failed, the Association continued to pressure legislators and by mid-1917 had succeeded in signing on thirty-nine state governors in support of a memorial. The United States' entry into World War I postponed the Association's activities for several years, however, a rally in support of a memorial was held in Washington, D.C., in 1919.

While the Association had initially proposed some kind of physical memorial, reminiscent of existing ones found in the National Mall, they gradually began shifting their focus to the creation of a museum dedicated to African American contributions to American culture. A bill introduced in 1928 called for just such a structure:

A hall of fame, art and music rooms, library and reading rooms, museum, statues and tablets, which are proposed to commemorate the deeds American Negros wrought for the perpetuation and advancement of the nation, which would embody the utilitarian, aesthetic, and reverential, thus meeting the monument building ideas of the age as well as serving the race in a useful way.

This bill led to hearings in Congress, spearheaded by Representative J. Will Taylor and activist Ferdinand Lee Barnett. The hearings included a wide variety of witness testimony in favor of the memorial, with opposition primarily rooted in the idea that a memorial could constitute undue favorable treatment towards Black people over members of other races. The bill eventually passed both the House and Senate and was signed into law by President Calvin Coolidge on March 4, 1929.

== See also ==
- National Museum of African American History and Culture
