= Daughters of Union Veterans Civil War Memorial =

Statue and war memorial in Salem, Oregon, U.S.

- United States
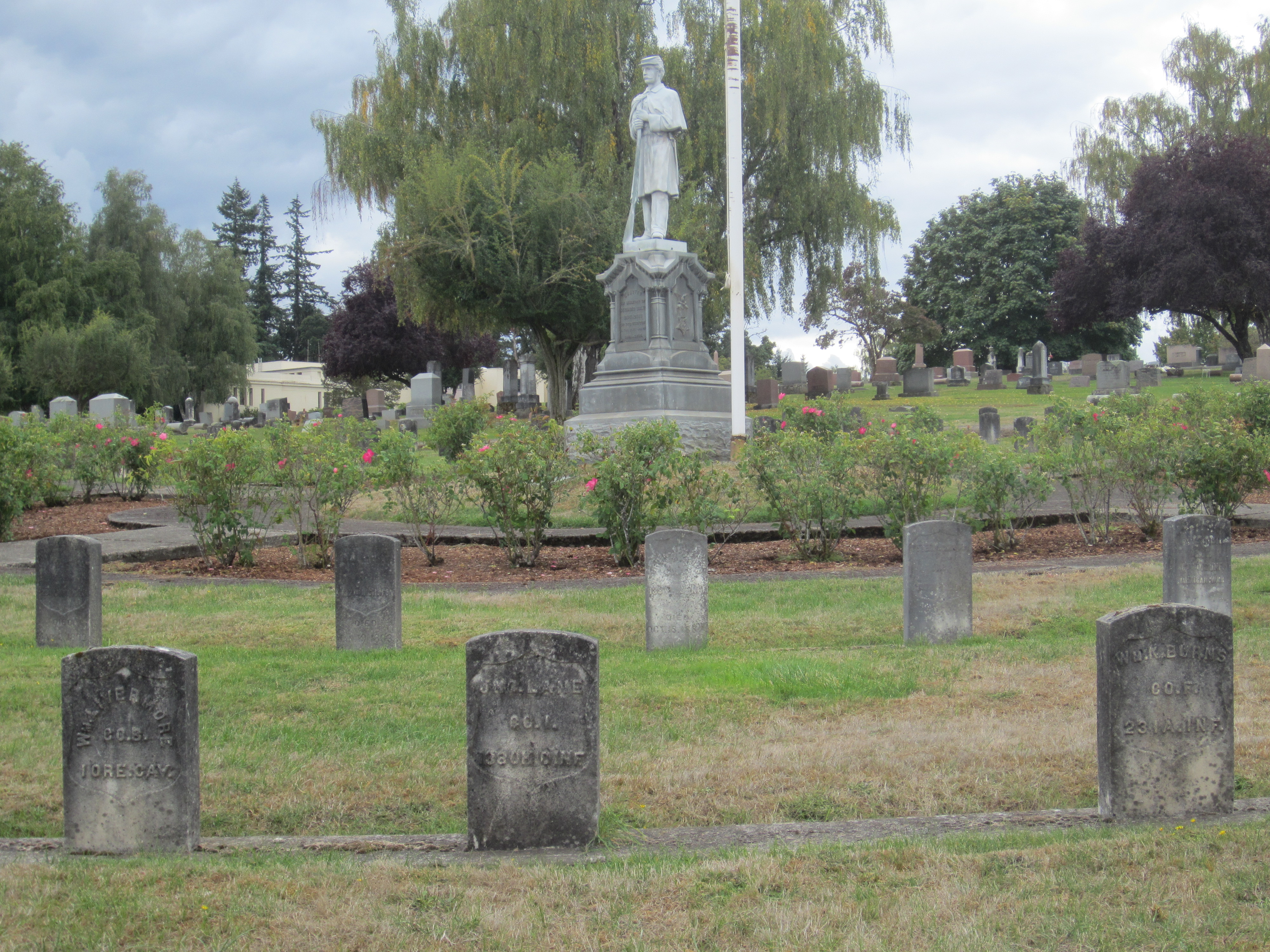
- The memorial in 2018
- For Union Civil War veterans
- Established: 1933; 93 years ago
- Location: 44.9192°N 123.0527°W; City View Cemetery near Salem, Oregon
- ERECTED / IN MEMORY OF / DECEASED BRAVE / DEFENDERS / OF OUR COUNTRY / IN THE CIVIL WAR OF / 1861–1865

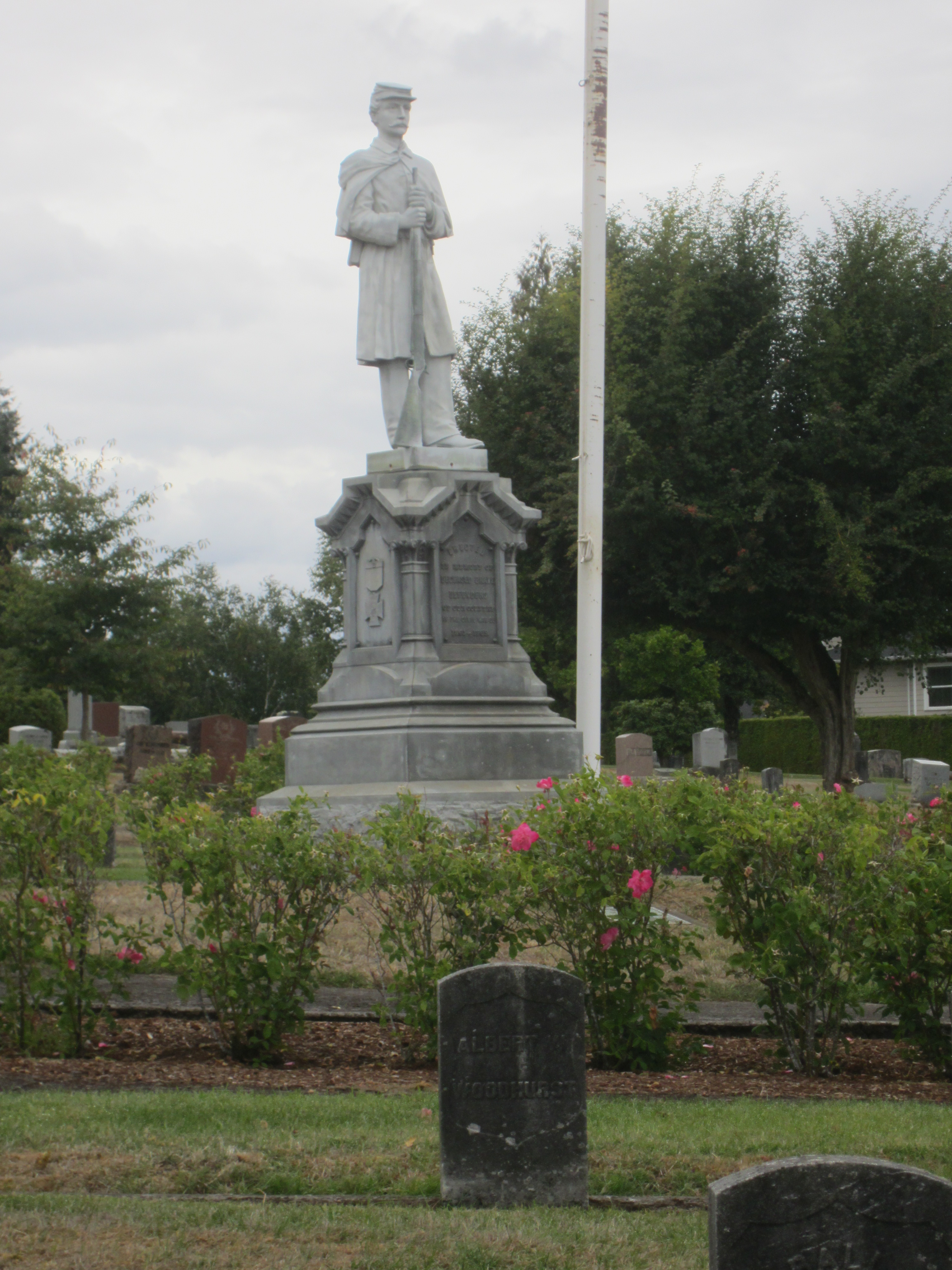
The statue, 2018

The Daughters of Union Veterans Civil War Memorial is an outdoor war memorial commemorating Union Civil War veterans, installed at City View Cemetery in Salem, Oregon, United States. The monument, erected by the Oregon Daughters of Union Veterans in 1933, features a statue of a soldier atop pedestal surrounded by two circles with markers honoring veterans. One plaque reads: ERECTED / IN MEMORY OF / DECEASED BRAVE / DEFENDERS / OF OUR COUNTRY / IN THE CIVIL WAR OF / 1861–1865.

== See also ==
- 1933 in art
- List of Union Civil War monuments and memorials
