= Camp Harlan-Camp McKean Historic District =

Historic district in Iowa, United States

- U.S. National Register of Historic Places
- U.S. Historic district
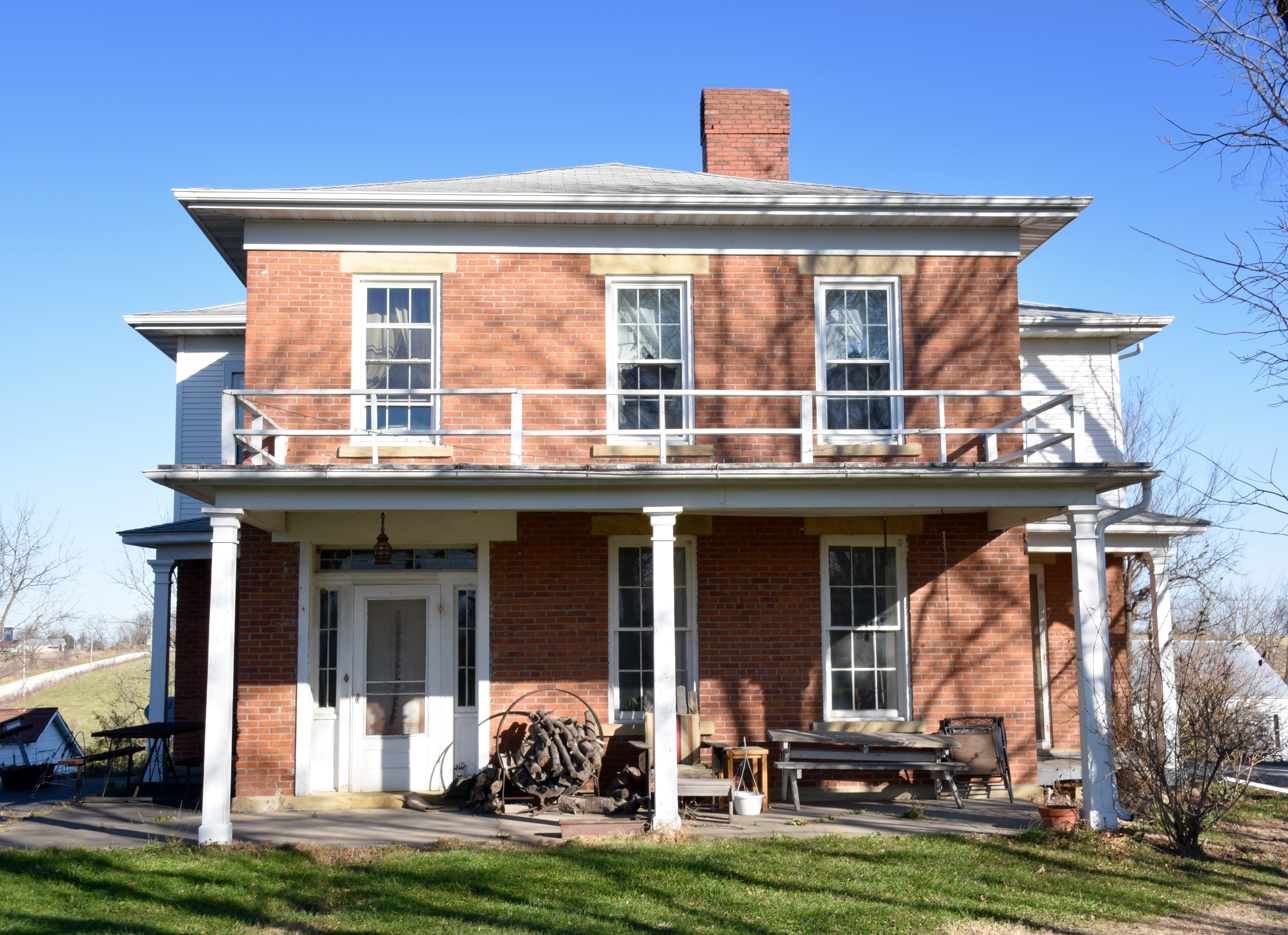
- Hugh B. and Mary Swan House (1854)

- Location within Iowa Location within the United States
- Location: 2260 Hickory Ave. Mount Pleasant, Iowa
- Coordinates: 40°58′46.6″N 91°34′41.4″W
- Area: 68 acres (28 ha)
- Built: 1854 (house); 1930 (marker)
- Architectural style: Greek Revival; Italianate
- NRHP reference No.: 12001117
- Added to NRHP: January 2, 2013

The Camp Harlan-Camp McKean Historic District, also known as the Hugh B. and Mary H. Swan Farmstead and the Springdale Stock Farm, is a nationally recognized historic district located northwest of Mount Pleasant, Iowa, United States. It was listed on the National Register of Historic Places in 2013. At the time of its nomination it consisted of eight resources, which includes two contributing buildings, one contributing site, one contributing object and four non-contributing buildings.

== Description ==
The district is a farm that was used as a rendezvous camp by the Union Army during the American Civil War. The two contributing buildings are brick farm buildings that were here when the camps were in operation. The Hugh B. and Mary Swan House (c. 1854) is a two-story brick structure that exhibits Greek Revival and Italianate influences. The two-level, brick spring house is a vernacular structure with a gable-roof. While typical in Pennsylvania, this is a rare example of a spring house in Iowa. A large stone was erected as a monument to the two Civil War camps in a southwest corner of the farm. It was placed by the Belle Coddington Tent No. 34 of the Daughters of Union Veterans, on June 8, 1930. The open rolling fields to the east of the house are the contributing site as they were the location of the camps. Four frame 20th-century farm buildings are the non-contributing buildings.

Hugh B. and Mary H. Swan are Pennsylvania natives who built the house and banked spring house around 1854. Part of the farm was leased by the Swans to the federal government for use as a rendezvous camp. Camp Harlan was located here from September 1861 to February 1862 and utilized by the 4th Iowa Cavalry. Camp McKean was located here from August 1862 to November 1862 and it was utilized by the 25th Iowa Infantry. A total of 27 rendezvous camps were utilized in Iowa during the Civil War, and for the most part, they were located along the Mississippi River. In addition to these two camps, "inland" camps were located in Iowa City, Des Moines, Ottumwa, and Oskaloosa. Camp Harlan/McKean was one of five camps in the state that were in operation during rendezvous phases two to four from the fall 1861 to the end of 1862. The other camps include Camp McClellan in Davenport, Camp Lincoln in Keokuk, Camp Union in Dubuque, and Camp Pope in Iowa City. Even though nothing remains of the camps above ground, they are considered well-preserved campsites when considered against the others, which have largely been redeveloped.
