= Soldiers and Sailors Monument (Buffalo, New York) =

Coordinates: 42°53′08″N 78°52′26″W

Soldiers and Sailors Monument is a war monument located in Lafayette Square, Buffalo, New York. It was the work of sculptor Casper Buberl and architect George Keller. The corner stone was laid on July 4, 1882 and the monument was dedicated on July 4, 1884.

The monument's shaft supports a 10-foot-6-inch (3.2 m) female figure, and four 8-foot (2.4 m) bronze statues, representing the infantry, artillery, cavalry and navy, sculpted by Caspar Buberl, which face the four cardinal points. Bronze bas-reliefs encircle the column above the statues. The female figure is a "nameless stone lady, "emblematic of Buffalo."

The dedication on the west (Main Street) side honors those who laid down their lives "in the war to maintain the union for the cause of their country and of mankind." Half of Abraham Lincoln's Gettysburg Address graces the east side of the monument. Several bas-relief panels feature scenes of Lincoln's original cabinet: Treasury Secretary Salmon Chase, Secretary of State William H. Seward, Attorney General Edward Bates, Postmaster General Montgomery Blair, Secretary of the Interior, Caleb Smith, Secretary of the Navy Gideon Welles, Major General Winfield Scott, and Secretary of War Simon Cameron.

== Gallery ==
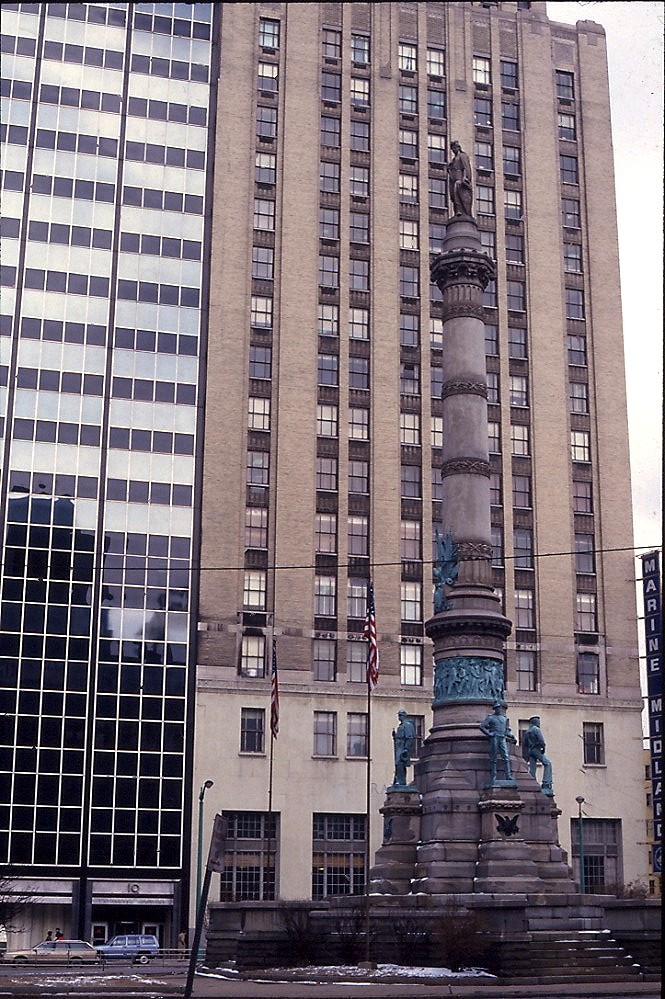

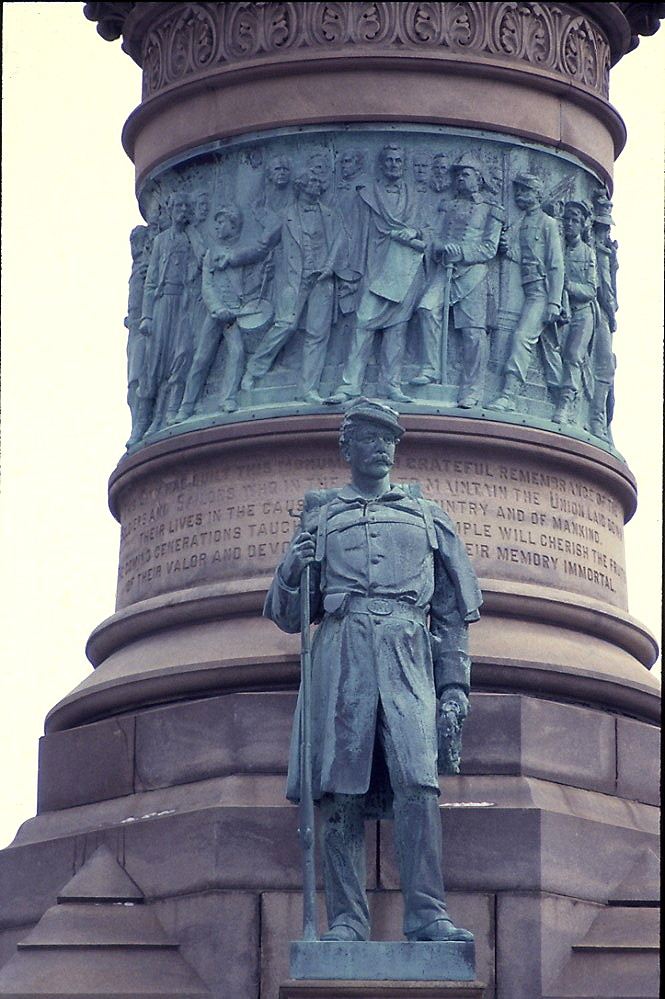
