= Sunfield, Michigan =

- Village
- Location of Sunfield, Michigan
- Coordinates: 42°45′36″N 84°59′30″W
- Country: United States
- State: Michigan
- County: Eaton
- Incorporated (village): 1899

Area
  - Total: 0.76 sq mi (1.97 km^{2})
  - Land: 0.76 sq mi (1.97 km^{2})
  - Water: 0 sq mi (0.00 km^{2})
- Elevation: 863 ft (263 m)

Population (2020)
  - Total: 518
  - Density: 682.2/sq mi (263.38/km^{2})
- Time zone: UTC-5 (Eastern (EST))
  - Summer (DST): UTC-4 (EDT)
- ZIP code: 48890
- Area code: 517
- FIPS code: 26-77420
- GNIS feature ID: 0639074
- Website: https://www.villageofsunfieldmi.com/

Sunfield is a village in Eaton County in the U.S. state of Michigan. The population was 518 at the 2020 census. The village is located within Sunfield Township. The Sunfield, Michigan post office was established in 1855.

== Geography ==
According to the United States Census Bureau, the village has a total area of 0.80 square miles (2.07 km^{2}), all land.

== Demographics ==
Historical population
Census	Pop.	Note	%±
1900	451		—
1910	385		−14.6%
1920	456		18.4%
1930	339		−25.7%
1940	348		2.7%
1950	400		14.9%
1960	626		56.5%
1970	497		−20.6%
1980	591		18.9%
1990	610		3.2%
2000	591		−3.1%
2010	578		−2.2%
2020	518		−10.4%
U.S. Decennial Census

=== 2010 census ===
As of the census of 2010, there were 578 people, 215 households, and 148 families living in the village. The population density was 722.5 inhabitants per square mile (279.0/km^{2}). There were 241 housing units at an average density of 301.3 per square mile (116.3/km^{2}). The racial makeup of the village was 96.7% White, 0.2% Asian, 1.4% from other races, and 1.7% from two or more races. Hispanic or Latino of any race were 3.6% of the population.

There were 215 households, of which 43.7% had children under the age of 18 living with them, 43.3% were married couples living together, 17.2% had a female householder with no husband present, 8.4% had a male householder with no wife present, and 31.2% were non-families. 26.0% of all households were made up of individuals, and 9.3% had someone living alone who was 65 years of age or older. The average household size was 2.65 and the average family size was 3.14.

The median age in the village was 32.4 years. 31.3% of residents were under the age of 18; 8.4% were between the ages of 18 and 24; 28.1% were from 25 to 44; 22.1% were from 45 to 64; and 10.2% were 65 years of age or older. The gender makeup of the village was 43.9% male and 56.1% female.

=== 2000 census ===
As of the census of 2000, there were 591 people, 222 households, and 156 families living in the village. The population density was 919.8 inhabitants per square mile (355.1/km^{2}). There were 235 housing units at an average density of 365.7 per square mile (141.2/km^{2}). The racial makeup of the village was 96.95% White, 0.51% African American, 0.17% Native American, 0.68% from other races, and 1.69% from two or more races. Hispanic or Latino of any race were 1.86% of the population.

There were 222 households, out of which 36.5% had children under the age of 18 living with them, 49.1% were married couples living together, 14.0% had a female householder with no husband present, and 29.7% were non-families. 23.9% of all households were made up of individuals, and 9.5% had someone living alone who was 65 years of age or older. The average household size was 2.66 and the average family size was 3.16.

In the village, the population was spread out, with 30.3% under the age of 18, 8.3% from 18 to 24, 28.4% from 25 to 44, 22.2% from 45 to 64, and 10.8% who were 65 years of age or older. The median age was 32 years. For every 100 females, there were 85.3 males. For every 100 females age 18 and over, there were 89.9 males.

The median income for a household in the village was $41,607, and the median income for a family was $50,729. Males had a median income of $38,750 versus $23,889 for females. The per capita income for the village was $18,779. About 1.9% of families and 4.0% of the population were below the poverty line, including 4.8% of those under age 18 and 7.5% of those age 65 or over.
