= 14th Illinois Infantry Regiment =

14th Regiment, Illinois Volunteer Infantry (3 Year)
- Illinois flag
- Active: May 25, 1861 – September 18, 1865
- Country: United States
- Allegiance: Union
- Branch: United States Army; Union Army
- Type: Infantry
- Engagements: Battle of Shiloh; Battle of Hatchie's Bridge; Siege of Vicksburg; Battle of Bentonville

Commanders
- Colonel: John M. Palmer

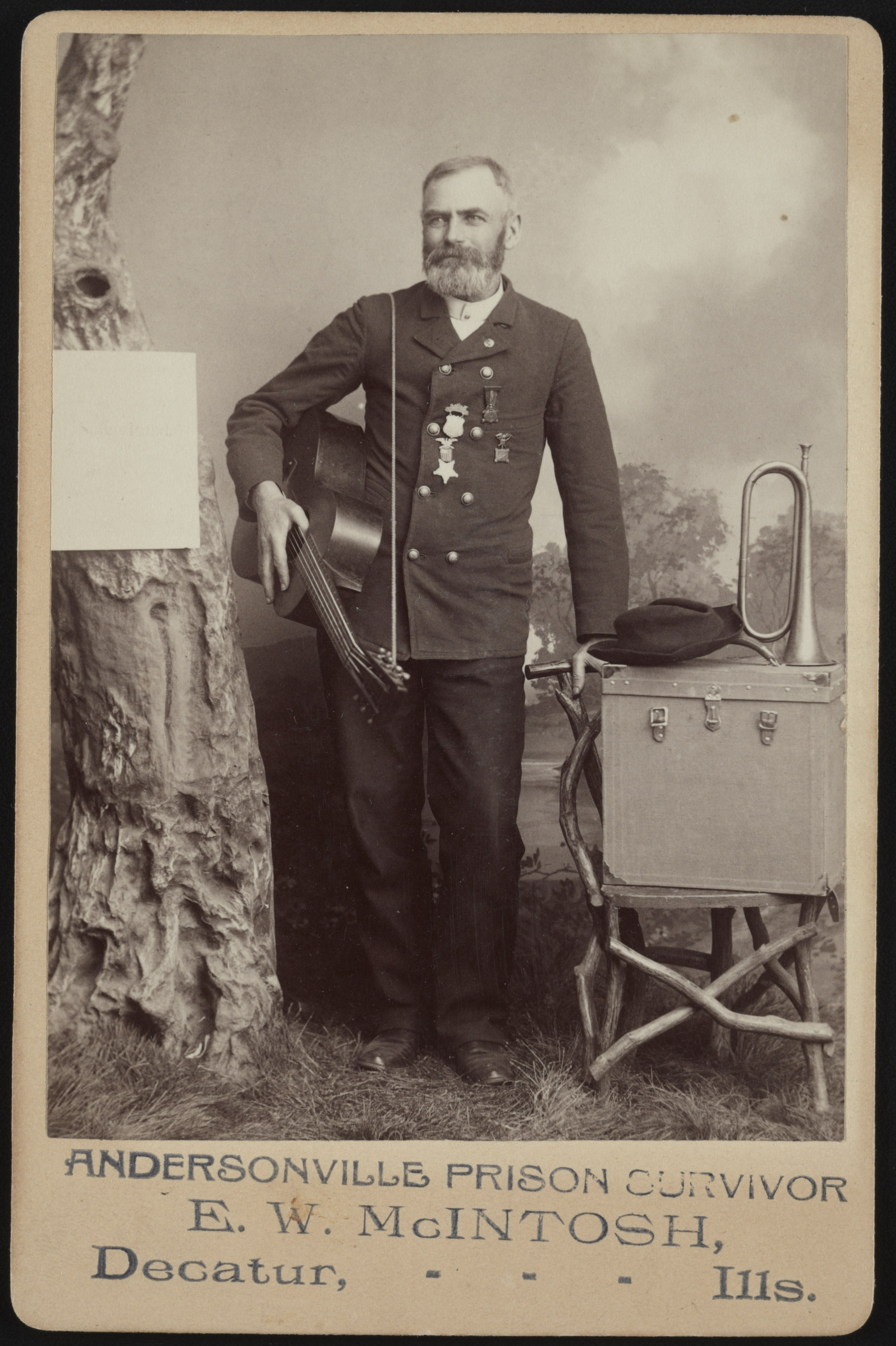
Private E.W. McIntosh of Co. E, 14th Illinois Infantry Regiment in uniform with guitar and bugle in front of painted backdrop. On verso: Andersonville Prison Survivor, E.W. McIntosh, Decatur, Ills. From the Liljenquist Family Collection of Civil War Photographs, Prints and Photographs Division, Library of Congress

The 14th Regiment, Illinois Volunteer Infantry was an infantry regiment that served in the Union Army during the American Civil War. It was one of the ten infantry regiments authorized on May 2, 1861, by the Illinois Ten Regiment Act.

== Service ==
The 14th Illinois Infantry was mustered into Federal service for a three-year enlistment on May 25, 1861, at Jacksonville, Illinois.

After Training at Camp Duncan, the regiment moved to Missouri in July 1861. Operating alongside the 16th Illinois, the unit helped suppress secessionist activity, including the dispersal of forces under Martin E. Green. The regiment wintered at Otterville, Missouri, after participating in General Fremont's Campaign towards Springfield.

=== Battle of Shiloh and Corinth ===
In February 1862, the regiment arrived at Fort Donelson the day after its surrender. It was attached to the 2nd Brigade, Fourth Division, under Brigadier General Stephen A. Hurlbut.

At the Battle of Shiloh, the 14th Illinois experienced its first major combat engagement, suffering casualties that amounted to half of its engaged. The regimental colors were struck by 42 bullets during the battle. On the Evening of the second day, Colonel Cyrus Hall led the Regiment in a final charge that made Brigadier General James Veatch Credit them with driving the enemy beyond Union lines and closing the battle. The Regiment Later Participated in the Siege of Corinth.

=== Battles of Hatchie's Bridge and Vicksburg ===
On October 4th, 1862, the regiment fought at the Battle of Hatchie's Bridge, where it was engaged against retreating Confederate forces following the Second Battle of Corinth.

In 1863, the 14th Illinois participated in the Siege of Vicksburg until its surrender on July 4th. Following this victory, the regiment took part in the expedition to Jackson, Mississippi, and the capture of Fort Beauregard in Louisiana.

=== Consolidation and Later Service ===
In early 1864, many members of the regiment re-enlisted as veterans. During the Atlanta Campaign, the 14th and 15th Illinois, which served closely together since 1862, were consolidated into the 14th and 15th Illinois Veteran Battalion

The battalion was assigned to guard the Western and Atlantic Railroad near Ackworth, Georgia. In October 1864, during Confederate General Hood's Raid on Sherman's Rear, the battalion was overwhelmed; many of its members were killed, and the majority were captured and sent to Andersonville.

The Survivors of the battalion who escaped capture were mounted and served as scouts during Sherman's March to the Sea. They were the first Union troops to reach the Defenses of Savannah. During the Carolinas Campaign, the battalion served as skirmishers, participating in the capture of Cheraw and Fayetteville, and the Battle of Bentonville.

In the spring of 1865, at Goldsboro, North Carolina, the battalion was discontinued, and the 14th Illinois was restored to a regiment after the arrival of recruits. After the surrender of Joseph E. Johnston's army, the regiment participated in the Grand Review of the Armies.

Before being mustered out, the regiment was sent to Fort Leavenworth, Kansas, and later to Fort Kearney for Garrison Duty. The 14th Illinois was mustered out of service on September 16, 1865, and received its final pay in Springfield on the 22nd.

== Total strength and casualties ==
The regiment suffered 62 enlisted soldiers killed in action or mortally wounded, and 1 officer and 160 enlisted who died of disease, for a total of 223 fatalities.

== Commanders ==
- Colonel John M. Palmer - promoted to brigadier general.
- Colonel Cyrus Hall
- Lt. Colonel William Cam(m)

== See also ==
- List of Illinois Civil War Units
- Illinois in the American Civil War
