= Grand Army of the Republic =

American fraternal organization of Civil War veterans (1866–1956)

- Abbreviation: GAR
- Successor: Woman's Relief Corps and Sons of Union Veterans of the Civil War Ladies of the Grand Army of the Republic, Inc
- Formation: April 6, 1866
- Founder: Benjamin Franklin Stephenson
- Dissolved: August 2, 1956
- Type: Veterans' organization

The Grand Army of the Republic (GAR) was a fraternal organization composed of veterans of the Union Army (United States Army), Union Navy (U.S. Navy), and the Marines who served in the American Civil War. It was founded in 1866 in Decatur, Illinois, and grew to include thousands of "posts" (local community units) across the North and West. It was dissolved in 1956 at the death of its last member, Albert Woolson.

According to Stuart McConnell:

The Grand Army of the Republic, the largest of all Union Army veterans' organizations, was the most powerful single-issue political lobby of the late nineteenth century, securing massive pensions for veterans and helping to elect five postwar presidents from its own membership. To its members, it was also a secret fraternal order, a source of local charity, a provider of entertainment in small municipalities, and a patriotic organization.

Linking men through their experience of the war, the GAR became among the first organized advocacy groups in American politics, supporting voting rights for black veterans, promoting patriotic education, helping to make Memorial Day a national holiday, lobbying Congress to establish regular veterans' pensions, and supporting Republican political candidates. Its peak membership, at 410,000, was in 1890, a high point of various Civil War commemorative and monument dedication ceremonies.

== History ==
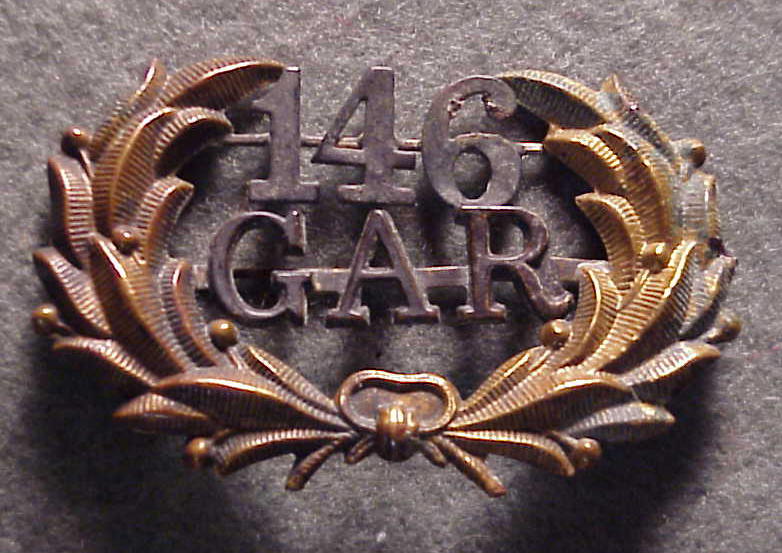
GAR Uniform Hat Badge from Post No. 146, "RG Shaw Post", named after Colonel Robert Gould Shaw and established by surviving members of the 54th Massachusetts Infantry Regiment in 1871 (R. Andre Stevens Civil War Collection)

After the end of the American Civil War, various state and local organizations were formed for veterans to network and maintain connections with each other. Many of the veterans used their shared experiences as a basis for fellowship. Groups of men began joining, first for camaraderie and later for political power. Emerging as most influential among the various organizations during the first post-war years was the Grand Army of the Republic, founded on April 6, 1866, on the principles of "Fraternity, Charity and Loyalty," in Decatur, Illinois, by Dr. Benjamin Franklin Stephenson. The GAR almost disappeared in the early 1870s, and many state-centered divisions, named "departments", and local posts ceased to exist.

In his General Order No. 11, dated May 5, 1868, first GAR Commander-in-Chief, General John A. Logan declared May 30 to be Memorial Day (also referred to for many years as "Decoration Day"), calling upon the GAR membership to make the May 30 observance an annual occurrence. Although not the first time war graves had been decorated, Logan's order effectively established "Memorial Day" as the day upon which Americans now pay tribute to all their war casualties, missing-in-action, and deceased veterans. As decades passed, similarly inspired commemorations also spread across the South as "Confederate Memorial Day" or "Confederate Decoration Day", usually in April, led by organizations of Southern soldiers in the parallel United Confederate Veterans.

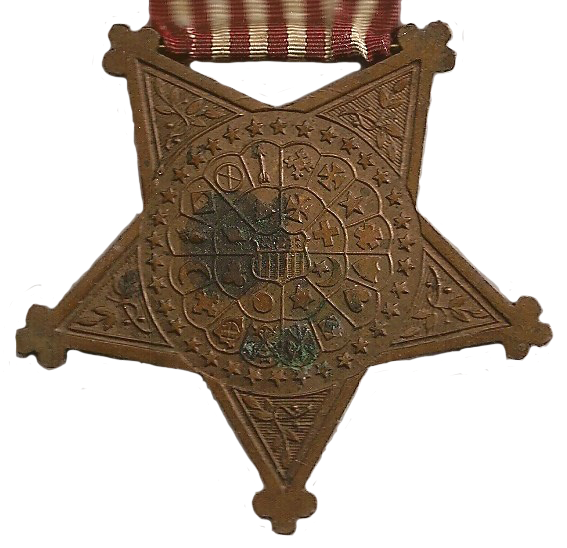
Reverse of the GAR Badge

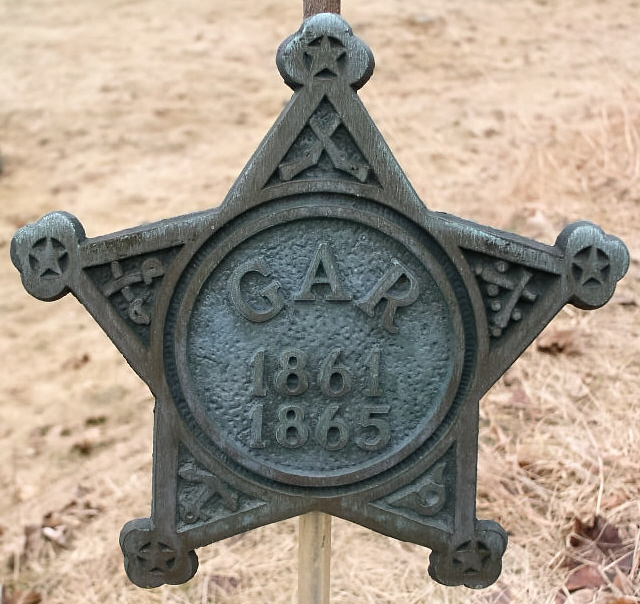
GAR marker, beside a veteran's grave in Portland Street Cemetery, South Berwick, Maine

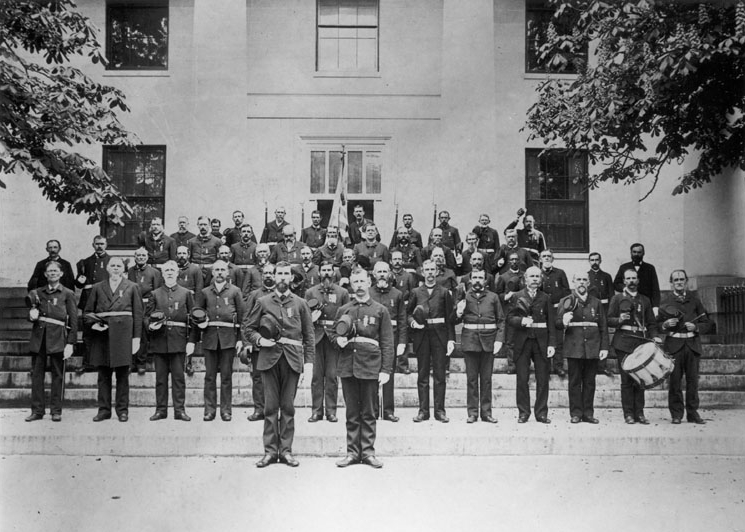
Department of Massachusetts GAR Post 144, Dedham Massachusetts 1886

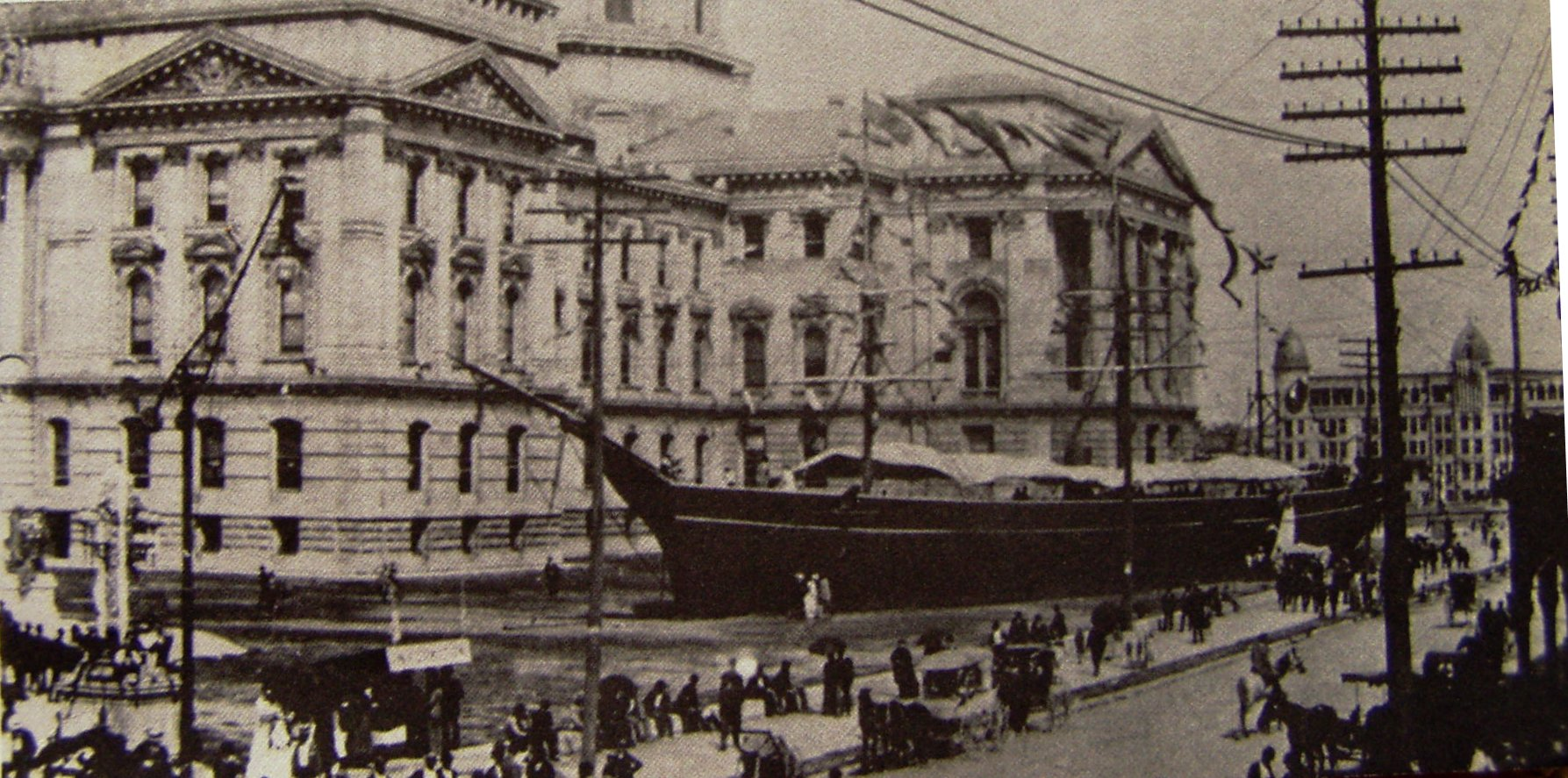
A replica of the USS Kearsarge displayed at the 1893 GAR National Convention in Indianapolis, Indiana

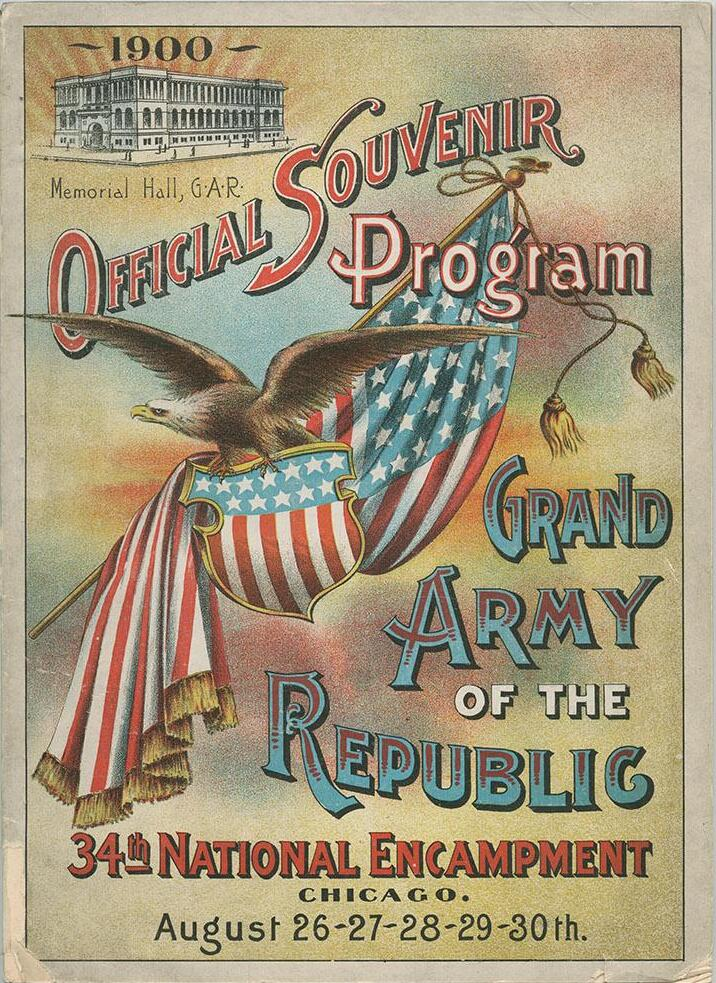
Grand Army of the Republic National Encampment bulletin in 1900

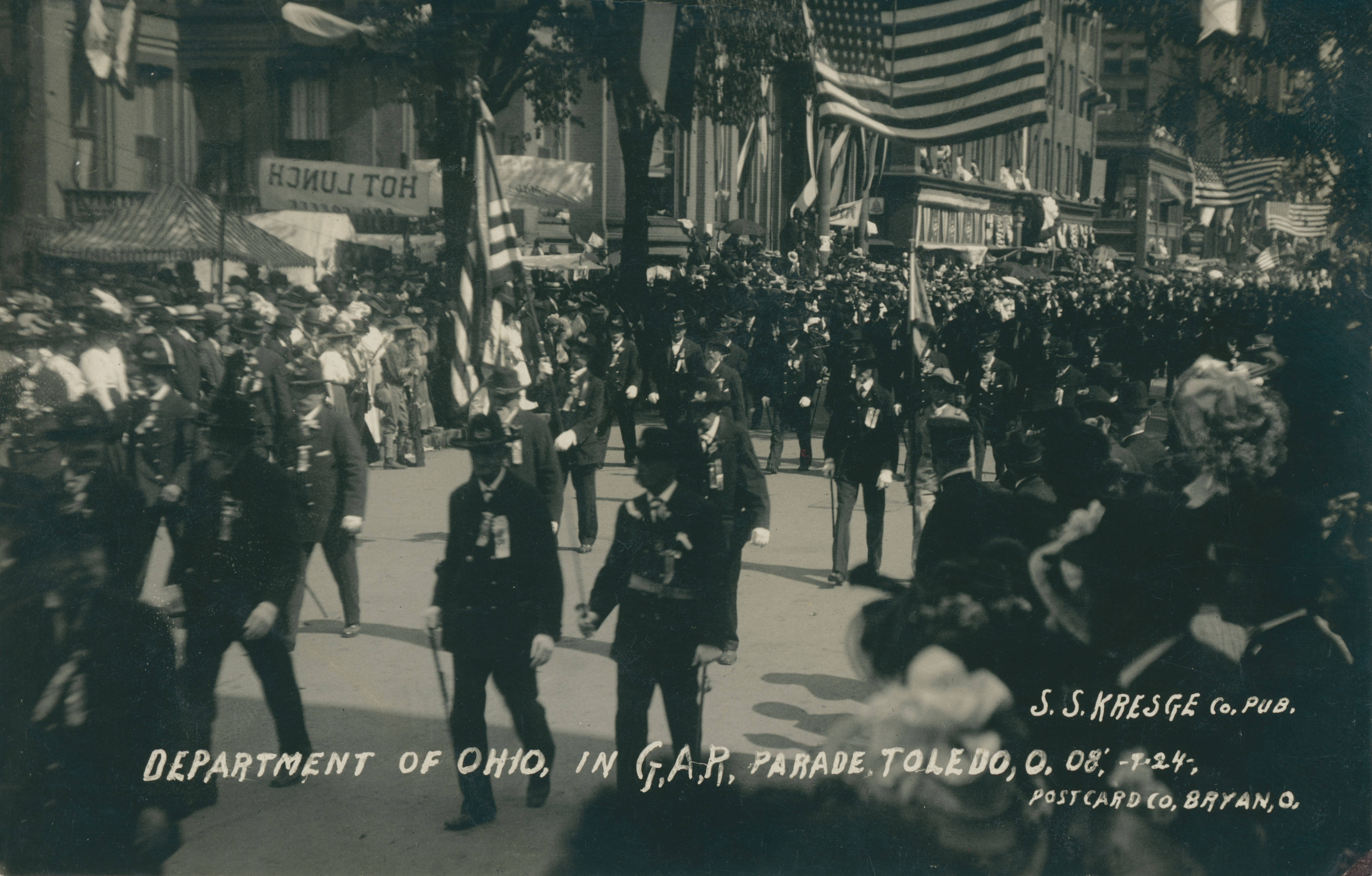
Department of Ohio marching in GAR Parade, Toledo, Ohio, 1908

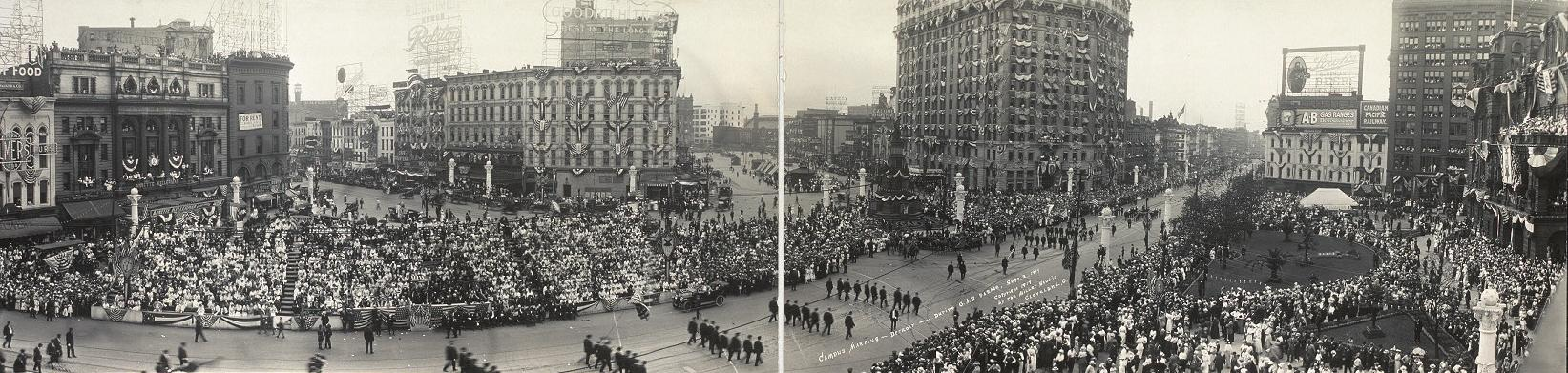
GAR parade during the 1914 Encampment in Detroit, Michigan

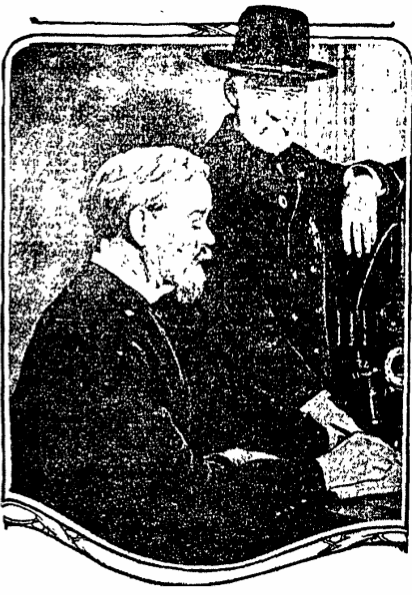
A.C. Shafer and Commander C.H. Haskins, standing, observed the transfer of the Departmental Headquarters of the Grand Army of the Republic from San Francisco to Los Angeles in June 1917.

In the 1880s, the Union veterans' organization revived under new leadership that provided a platform for renewed growth, by advocating Federal pensions for veterans. As the organization revived, black veterans joined in significant numbers and organized local posts. In at least one case, in Ohio, an African American was elected as the commander of a predominately white post. This was Robert A. Pinn of Hart Post 124 in Massillon, Ohio. While the national organization may have failed to press the case for pensions for black soldiers, many of them did receive federal pensions, and the papers in these pension files are now a rich source for African American genealogical research. Some sources emphasize that these pensions for black soldiers were less frequent than for their white counterparts. Some African American members of the GAR organized the National Memorial Association to advocate for a memorial to black soldiers in 1919.

The GAR was organized into "Departments" at the state level and "Posts" at the community level, and military-style uniforms were worn by its members. There were posts in every state in the U.S., and several posts overseas. The pattern of establishing departments and local posts was later used by other American military veterans' organizations, such as the Veterans of Foreign Wars (organized originally for veterans of the Spanish–American War and the Philippine Insurrection) and the later American Legion (for the First World War and later expanded to include subsequent World War II, Korean, Vietnam and Middle Eastern wars).

The GAR's political power grew during the latter part of the 19th century, and it helped elect several United States presidents, beginning with the 18th, Ulysses S. Grant, and ending with the 25th, William McKinley. Six Civil War veterans (Grant, Rutherford B. Hayes, James A. Garfield, Chester A. Arthur; Benjamin Harrison, and McKinley) were elected President of the United States; all were Republicans. (The sole post-war Democratic president was Grover Cleveland--he bought a substitute and did not serve in the Civil War, but he did veto many pension laws passed by Congress.) Of the six mentioned US Presidents, at least five were members of the GAR but there is no record of membership for Chester Arthur, who was a Union general:

- Ulysses S. Grant (Lt General of the Union Armies) Became a member of the Philadelphia PA George G. Meade Post GAR Post # 1 May 16, 1877
- Rutherford B. Hayes (Brevet Major General) Became a Member of the Fremont Ohio Manville Moore GAR Post
- James A. Garfield (Major General) Possibly a member of the GAR – a GAR Post publication refers to the death of Comrade James Garfield, President of the United States
- Benjamin Harrison (Brevet Brigadier General) Became a member of the Indianapolis Indiana General George H. Thomas GAR Post
- William McKinley. (Brevet Major of the 23d Ohio) Became a member of the Canton Ohio GAR Post # 25 July 7, 1880 [It was later renamed McKinley GAR Post # 25]

With membership strictly limited to soldiers, sailors or Marines who served in the Army, Navy, Marine Corps, or Revenue Cutter Service of the United States of America during the War of the Rebellion 1861–1865, the GAR encouraged the formation of Allied Orders to aid them in various works. Numerous male organizations jousted for the backing of the GAR, and the political battles became quite severe until the GAR finally endorsed the Sons of Union Veterans of the Civil War as its heir.

The GAR, according to Stuart McConnell, promoted, "a nationalism that honored white, native-stock, middle-class males and ...affirmed a prewar ideal of a virtuous, millennial Republic, based on the independent producer, entrepreneurial capitalism, and the citizen-soldier volunteer."

=== Female members ===
The GAR had at least three women who were members.

The first female known to be admitted to the GAR was Kady Brownell, who served in the Union Army with her husband Robert, a private in the 1st Rhode Island Infantry at the First Battle of Bull Run in Virginia and with the 5th Rhode Island Infantry at the Battle of New Berne in North Carolina. Brownell was admitted as a member in 1870 to Elias Howe Jr. Post #3, in Bridgeport, Connecticut. The GAR insignia is engraved on her gravestone in the North Burial Ground in Providence, Rhode Island.

In 1897 the GAR admitted Sarah Emma Edmonds, who served in the 2nd Michigan Infantry as a disguised man named Franklin Thompson from May 1861 until April 1863. In 1882, she collected affidavits from former comrades in an effort to petition for a veteran's pension which she received in July 1884. Edmonds was only a member for a brief period as she died September 5, 1898; however she was given a funeral with military honors when she was reburied in Houston in 1901.

Dr. Mary Edwards Walker was a surgeon in the Union Army during the Civil War and a recipient of the Medal of Honor. She treated soldiers from both sides of the conflict, as well as civilians, and was captured by Confederate troops in 1864. Prior to her death in 1919, she was admitted to the Grand Army of the Republic.

Mary Bostwick Shellman was made an associate member of the Wilson Post No. 1 of the Department of Maryland Grand Army, circa 1899, for her lifelong work caring for soldiers and veterans, first as a teenage volunteer nurse and later for creating and continuing to lead one of the nation's oldest Decoration Day Parades in Westminster, Maryland. She made remembering and caring for veterans her life's work and saved at least five Union soldiers from having "pauper burials."

It is possible that other women were members of the GAR, as well.

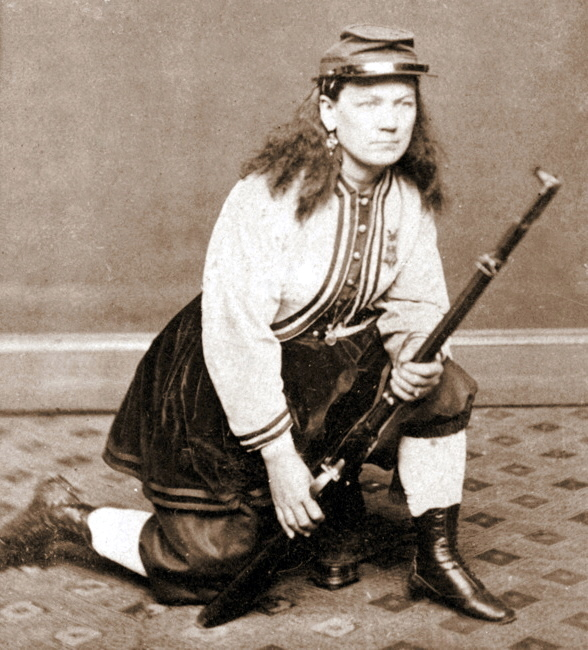
Kady Brownwell

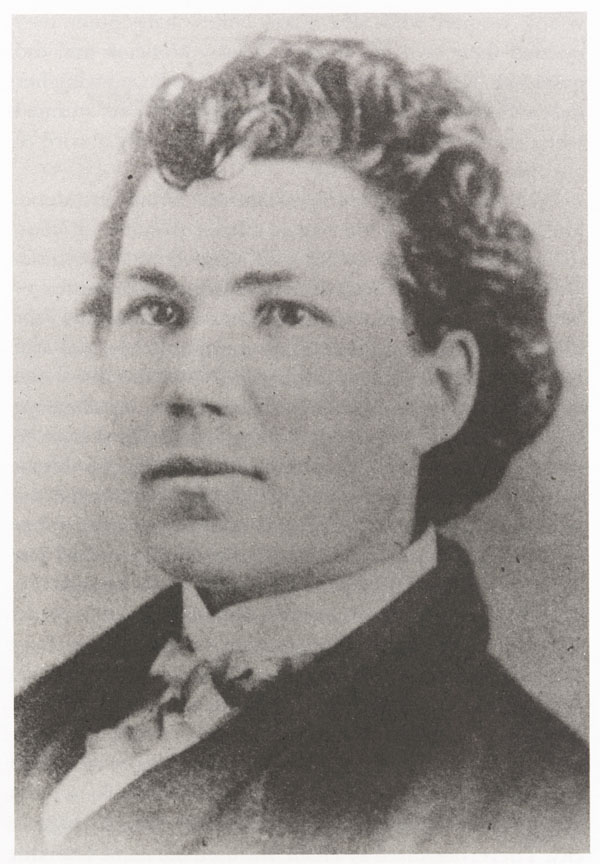
Sarah Emma Edmonds

=== Later years ===
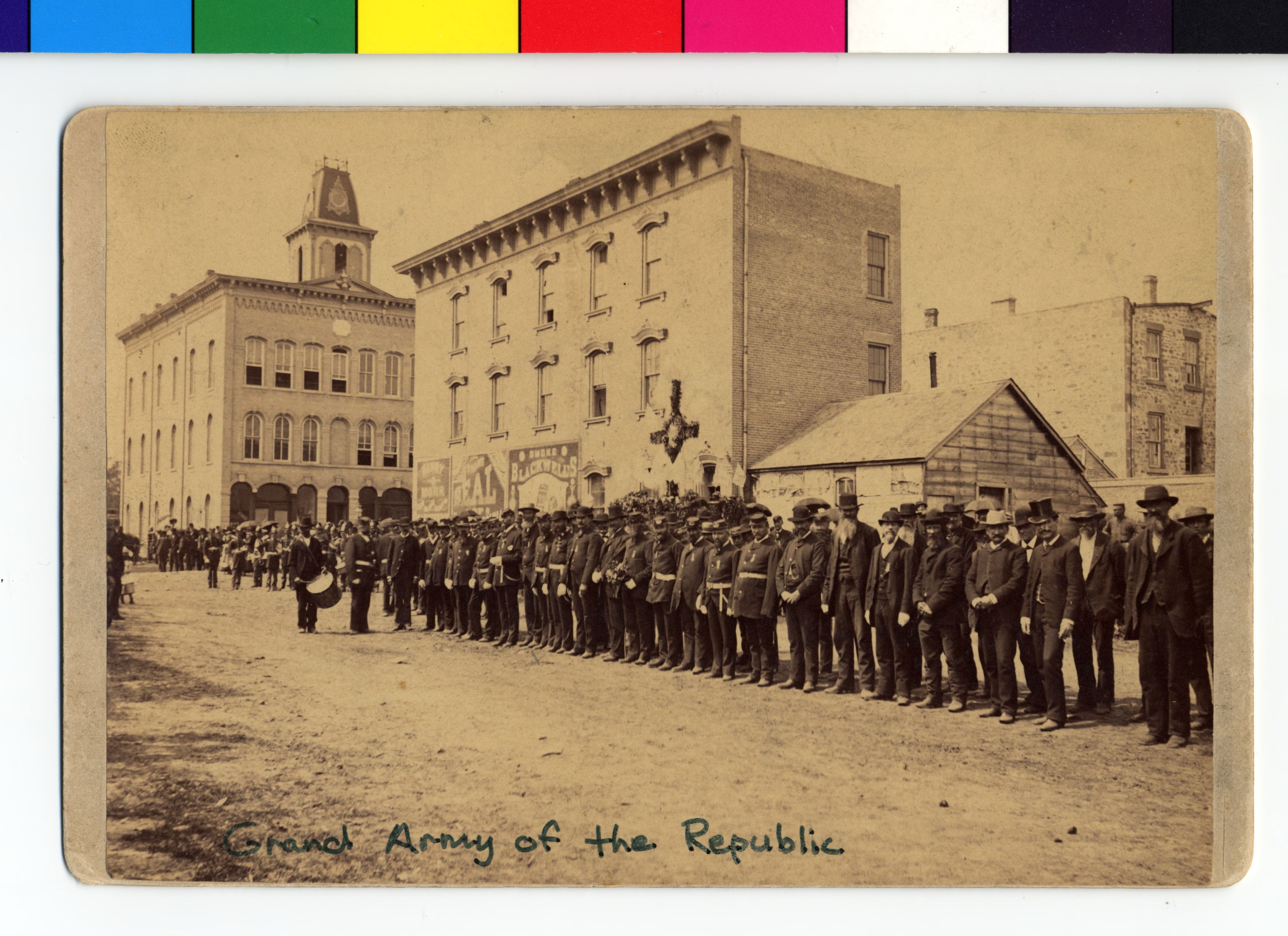
Grand Army of the Republic Encampment, Blue Earth County, Minnesota

The GAR reached its largest enrollment in 1890, with 410,000 members. It held a "National Encampment" in 1866 and then every year from 1868 to 1949. Interesting anecdotes from the war were told around the many campfires at these reunions and compiled in a book of campfire "chats", including descriptions of the festivities at the 1884–1886 encampments in Minneapolis, Portland, Maine and San Francisco. At the final encampment (the 83rd), in Indianapolis, Indiana, in 1949, the few surviving attendees voted to retain the existing officers in place until the organization's dissolution. Theodore Penland of Oregon, the GAR's Commander at the time, was therefore its last. At the time of the last national encampment, 16 members were still living and six were able to attend, including James Hard, the last combat veteran, who had fought at First Bull Run, Antietam, and Chancellorsville. In 1956, after the death of the last member, Albert Woolson, the GAR was formally dissolved.

== Memorials, honors and commemorations ==
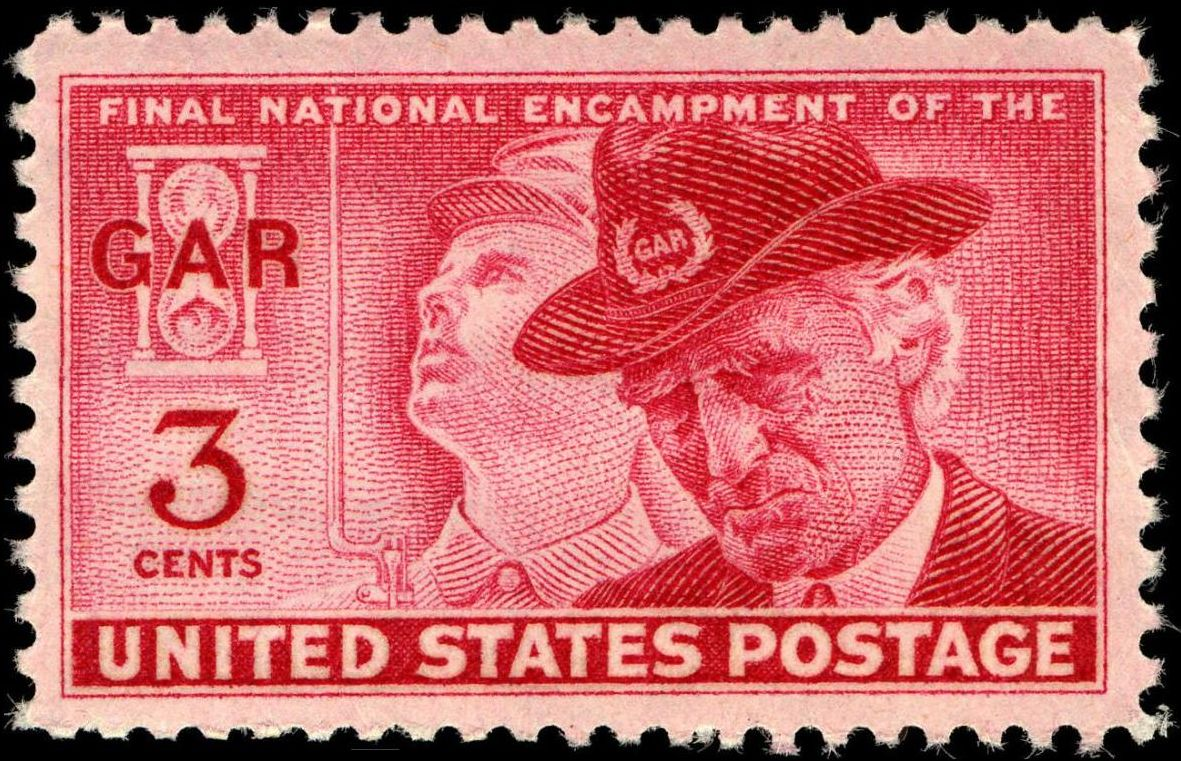
The 1948 postal stamp commemorating the GAR's final national encampment.

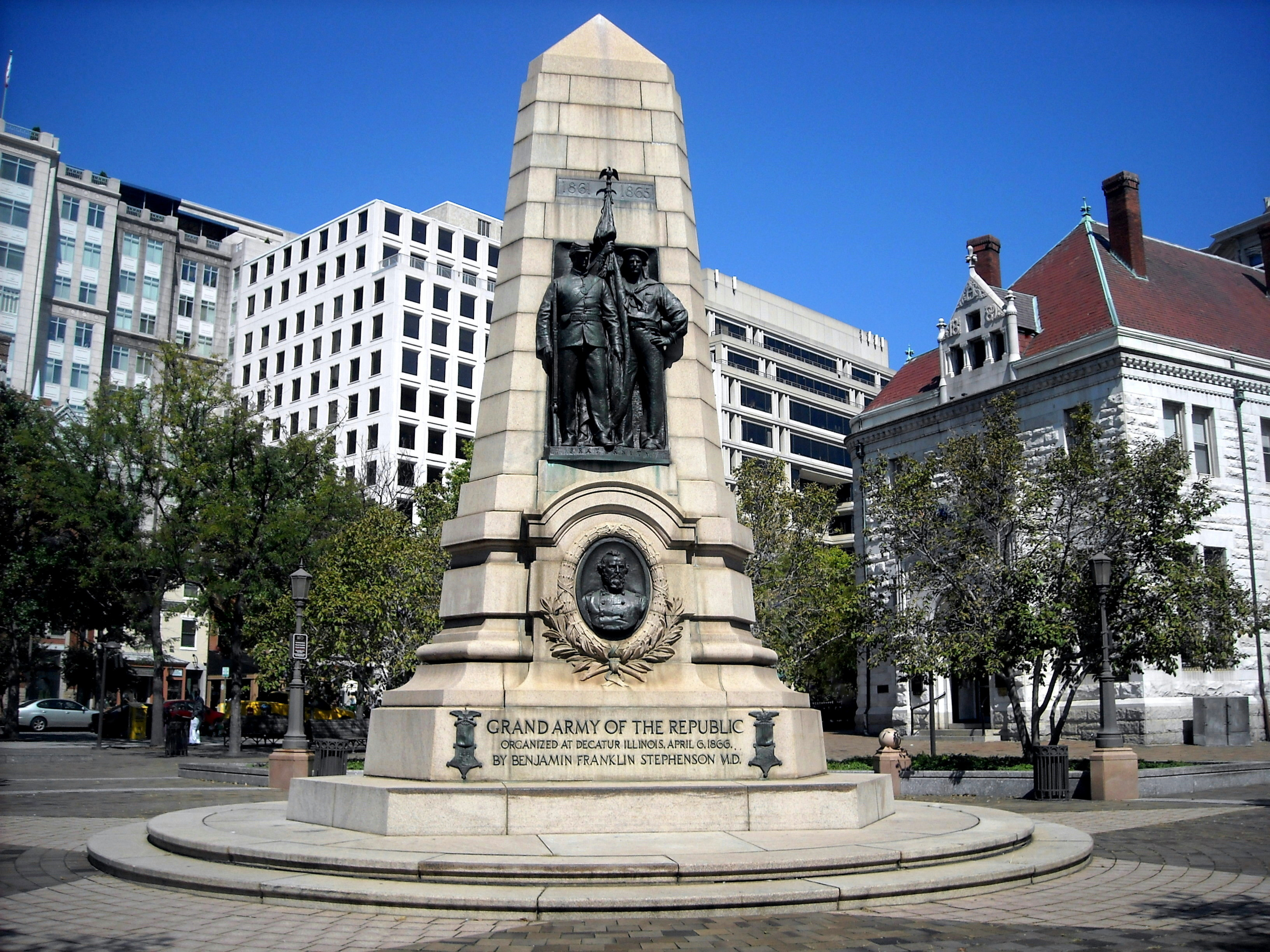
The Stephenson Grand Army of the Republic Memorial in Washington, D.C.

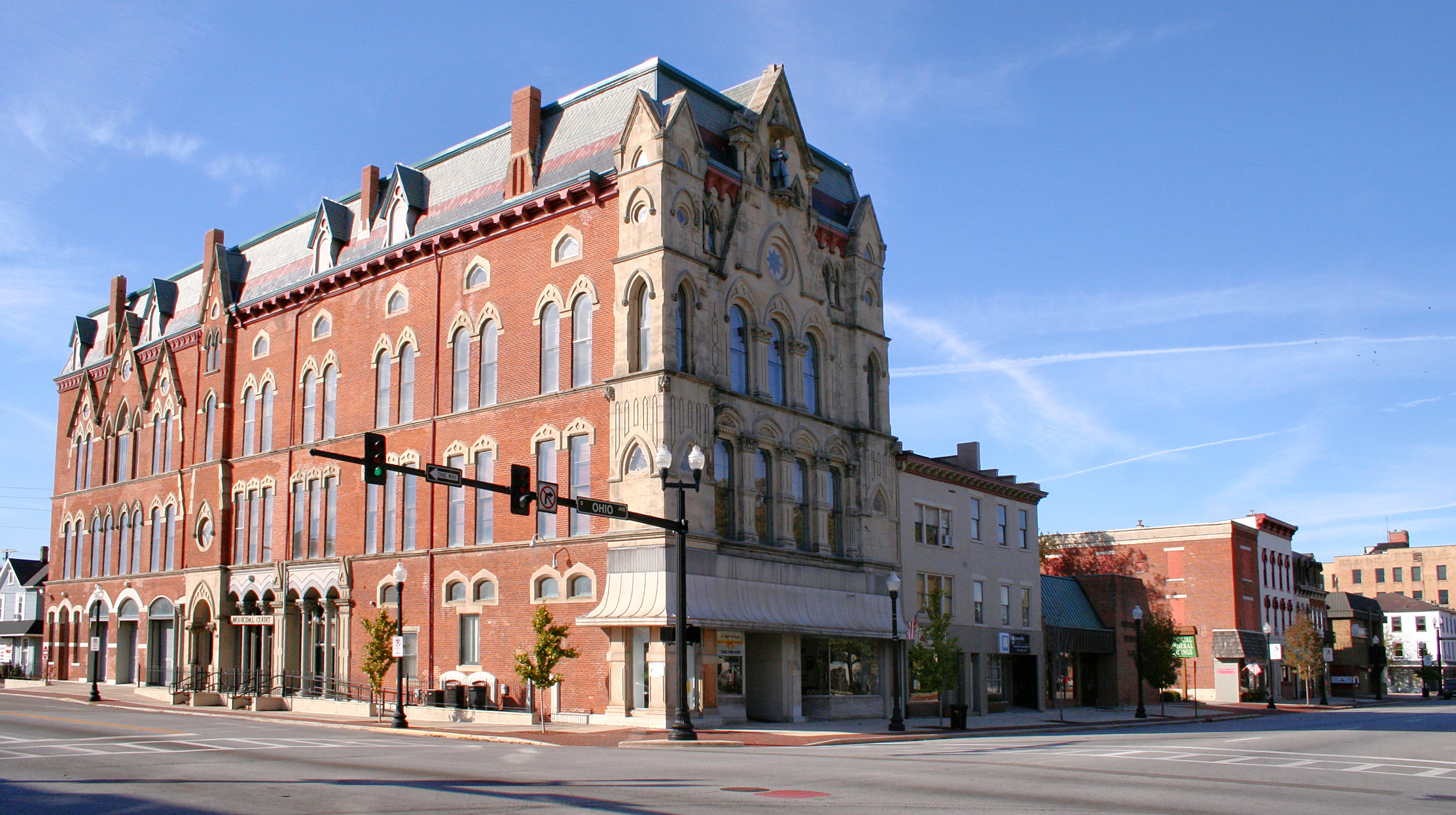
Memorial Hall Sidney, Ohio which housed the GAR Post.

There are physical memorials to the Grand Army of the Republic in numerous communities throughout the United States.

U.S. Route 6 is known as the Grand Army of the Republic Highway for its entire length.

The Commemoration of the American Civil War on postage stamps began during the conflict by both sides. In 1948, the Grand Army of the Republic was commemorated on a stamp. In 1951, the U.S. Postal Service printed a virtually identical stamp for the final reunion of the United Confederate Veterans.

== State posts ==
Every state (even those of the former Confederacy) fell within a GAR "Department," and within these Departments were the "Posts" (forerunners of modern American Legion Halls or VFW Halls). The posts were made up of local veterans, many of whom participated in local civic events. As the posts were formed, they were assigned to the home Department of the National Commander-in-chief of the year that they were chartered. There was no GAR post in London, but there was a Civil War Veterans Association Group that had many GAR members belonging to it.

As Civil War veterans died or were no longer able to participate in GAR activities, posts consolidated or were disbanded. Posts were assigned a sequential number based on their admission into the state's GAR organization, and most posts held informal names which honored comrades, battles, or commanders; it was not uncommon to have more than one post in a state honoring the same individual (such as Abraham Lincoln) and posts often changed their informal designation by vote of the local membership. See:

- List of Grand Army of the Republic posts in Kansas
- List of Grand Army of the Republic posts in Kentucky

== In literature and the arts ==
John Steinbeck's East of Eden features several references to the Grand Army of the Republic. Despite having very little actual battle experience during his brief military career, cut short by the loss of his leg, Adam Trask's father Cyrus joins the GAR and assumes the stature of "a great man" through his involvement with the organization. At the height of the GAR's influence in Washington, he brags to his son:

I wonder if you know how much influence I really have. I can throw the Grand Army at any candidate like a sock. Even the President likes to know what I think about public matters. I can get senators defeated and I can pick appointments like apples. I can make men and I can destroy men. Do you know that?

— Cyrus Trask (character), East of Eden

Later in the book, references are made to the graves of GAR members in California in order to emphasize the passage of time.

Sinclair Lewis also refers to the GAR in his acclaimed novel Main Street and in his novel It Can't Happen Here, as does Charles Portis in his classic novel True Grit. The GAR is briefly mentioned in William Faulkner's novel The Sound and the Fury and Willa Cather's short story "The Sculptor's Funeral" briefly references the organization.

The GAR is mentioned in the seldom-sung second verse of the patriotic song "You're a Grand Old Flag".

The GAR is referenced in John McCrae's poem He Is There! which was set to music in 1917 by Charles Ives as part of his cycle Three Songs of the War.

In Ward Moore's 1953 alternate history novel Bring the Jubilee, the Confederates won the Civil War and became a major world power while the rump United States was reduced to an impoverished dependence. The Grand Army of the Republic is the name of a nationalistic organization working to restore the United States to its former glory through acts of sabotage and terrorism.

The name appears in the Star Wars prequel era. Star Wars: The Clone Wars refers to the clone army as "The Grand Army of the Republic".

== Notable commanders-in-chief ==
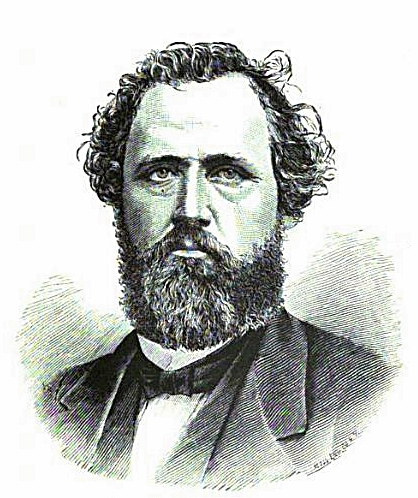
Benjamin F. Stephenson, 1866

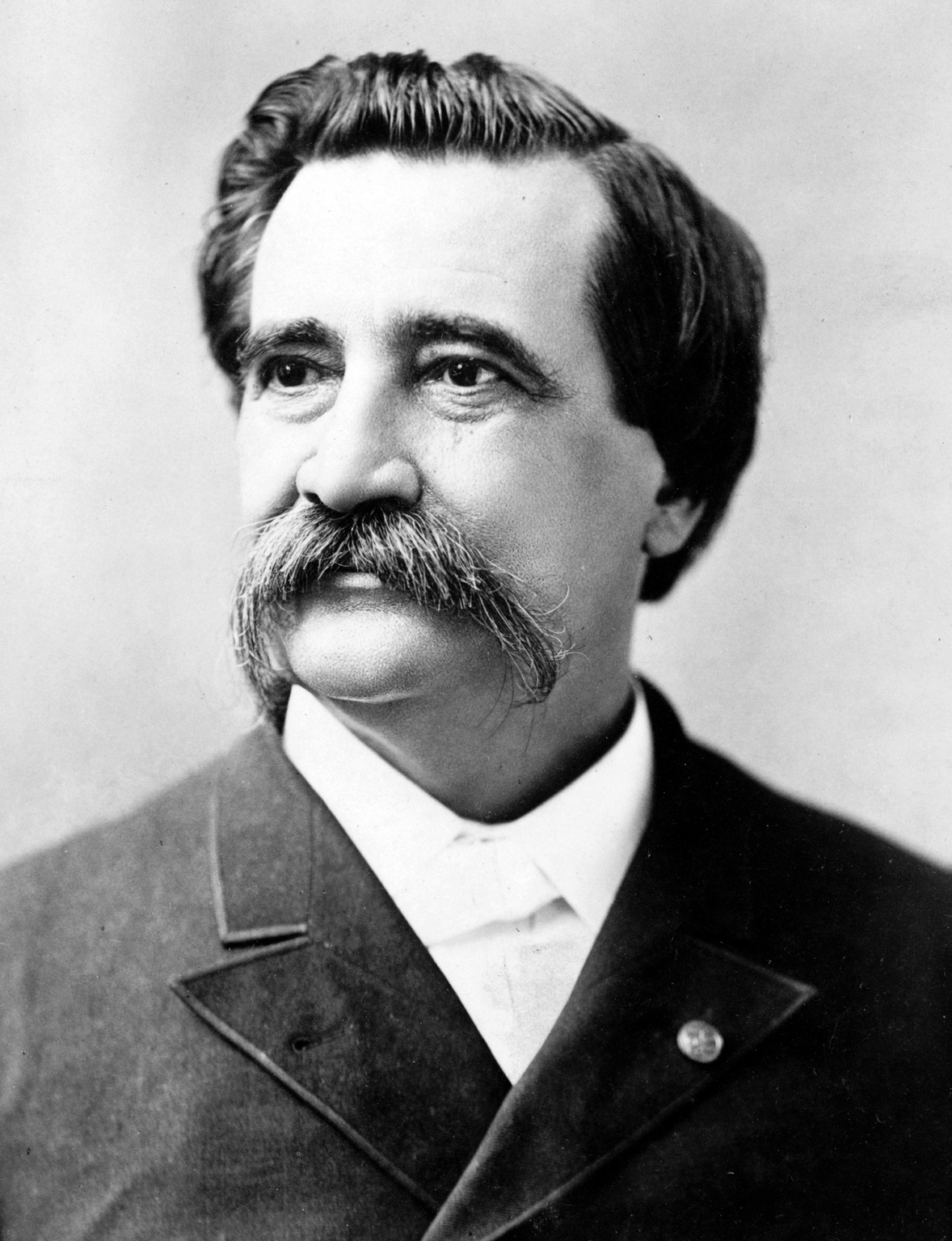
John Alexander Logan, 1868

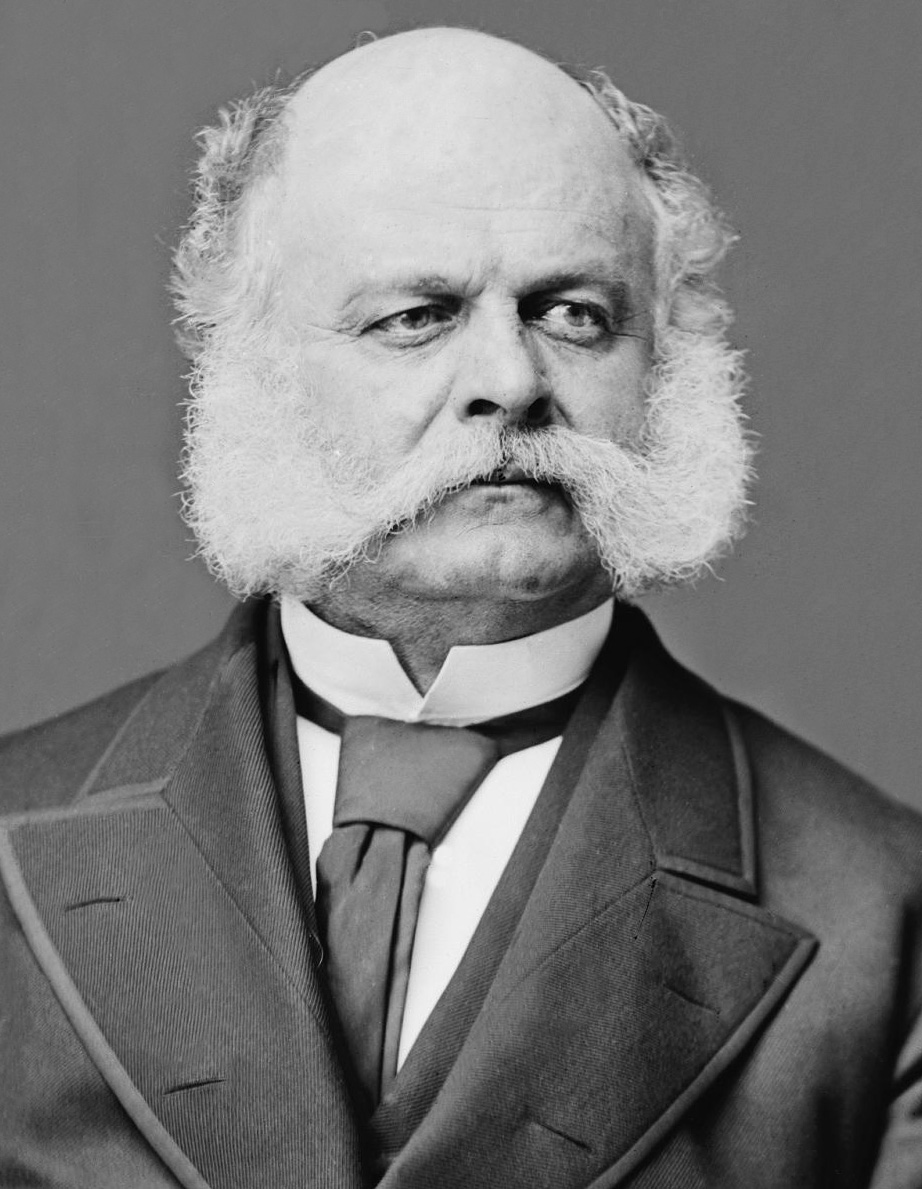
Ambrose Burnside, 1871

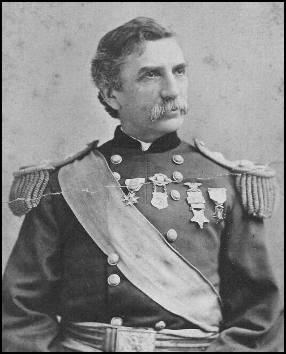
John Frederick Hartranft, 1875–1877 [Medal of Honor]

Paul Vandervoort, 1882

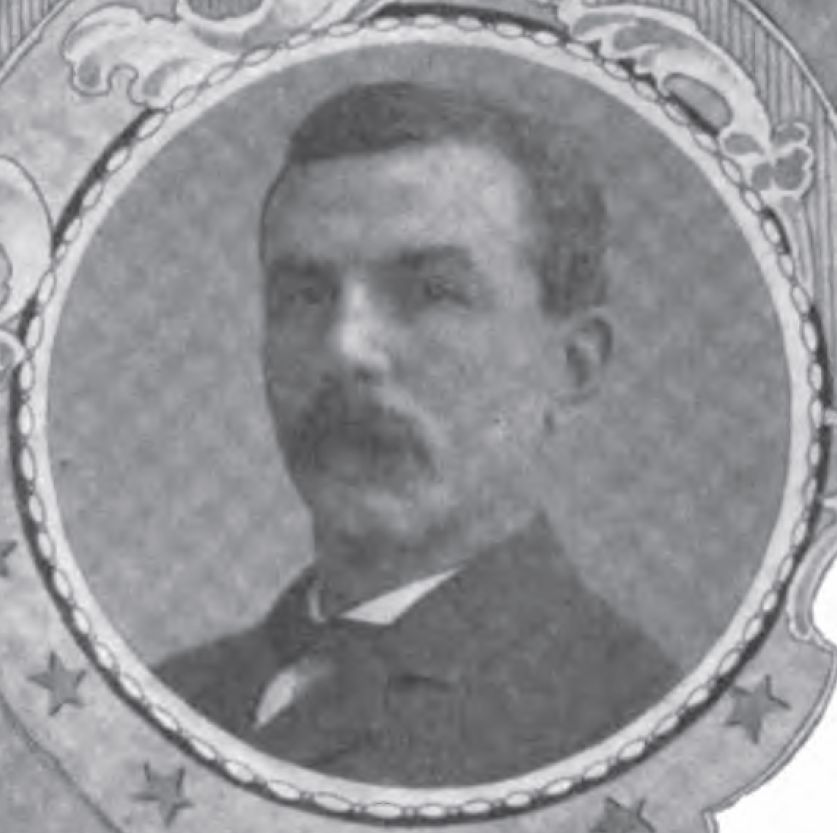
John S. Kountz, 1884

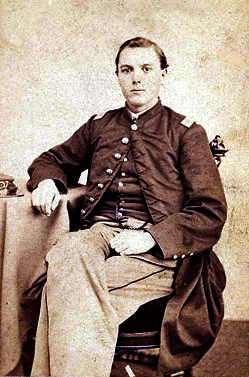
John G. B. Adams, 1893 [Medal of Honor]

John Peter Shindel Gobin, 1897

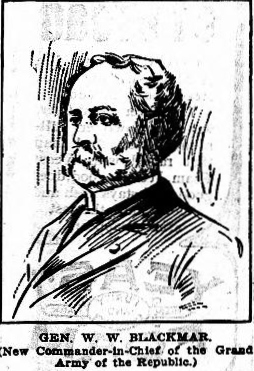
Wilmon W. Blackmar, 1904 [Medal of Honor]

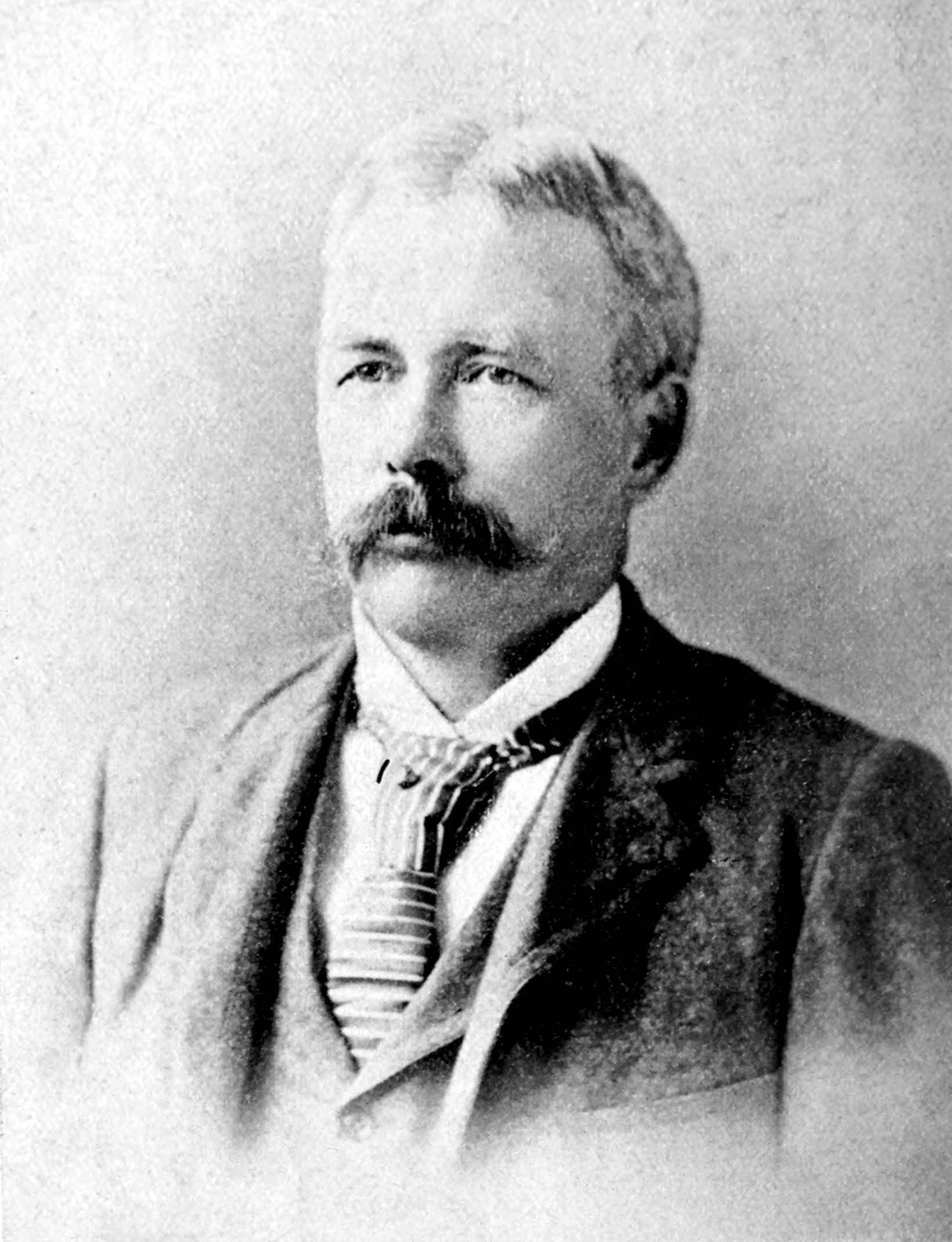
James R. Tanner,1905

== Women's auxiliaries ==
"Tea Tray Cadets" 1880 membership badge, an early women's auxiliary to the GAR

The Woman's Relief Corps was founded in 1879 as a "secret" organization and recognized in 1883 as the "official women's auxiliary" to the GAR.

The Ladies of the Grand Army of the Republic was also a significant organization. It was founded by Lelia P. Roby. As a congressionally chartered non-profit organization, it is the oldest women's hereditary organization in the United States. The original objectives of the organization included promotion of patriotism and loyalty to the Union, and participation in community service, especially for the aid of our Veterans and their dependents."

As original Union veterans of the GAR, organized in 1866, grew old, many women's groups formed to aid them and their widows and orphans. The Loyal Ladies League was established in 1881 as an auxiliary to the GAR; in 1886 the organization went more national and changed its name to "The Ladies of the Grand Army of the Republic." It was incorporated by Public Law 86-47 [S.949] of the 86th Congress on June 17, 1959

In 1899, the president was Dr. Julia P. Shade of Philadelphia, Pennsylvania.

Its president in 1922 was Mrs. Ethel M. Irish, of Fond du Lac, Wisconsin.

== See also ==
- Charles Sumner Post No. 25, Grand Army of the Republic
- Grand Army of the Republic Hall (disambiguation), list of halls across multiple states
- G. A. R. Memorial Junior/Senior High School, Wilkes-Barre, Pennsylvania
- Hamilton County Memorial Building, (Cincinnati, Ohio)
- Joel Minnick Longenecker
- List of Grand Army of the Republic commanders-in-chief
- National Association of Army Nurses of the Civil War
- Russell A. Alger
- Chester "Bromley" Hoke
- Sons of Union Veterans of the Civil War
