= Central National Bank Building =

Central National Bank Building may refer to:

- Central National Bank Building (Peoria, Illinois)
- Central National Bank (Topeka, Kansas), listed on the National Register of Historic Places (NRHP) in Shawnee County, Kansas
- Central National Tower, Battle Creek, Michigan, listed on the NRHP in Calhoun County, Michigan
- McDonald Investment Center, in Cleveland, Ohio, formerly known as Central National Bank Building
- Central National Bank (Alva, Oklahoma)
- Central National Bank (Richmond, Virginia)
- Central National Bank (Washington, D.C.)

== See also ==
- Central National Bank (disambiguation)
- FirstMerit Tower, Akron, Ohio, also known as the First National Bank Building or the First Central Trust Building
