= Central National Bank =

Central National Bank may refer to:

- Central National Bank (Alva, Oklahoma)
- Central National Bank (Richmond, Virginia)
- Central National Bank (Washington, D.C.)
- Central National Bank (Topeka, Kansas), listed on the NRHP in Kansas

== See also ==
- Central National Bank Building (disambiguation)
