= Tonari (restaurant) =

Restaurant in Washington, D.C., U.S.

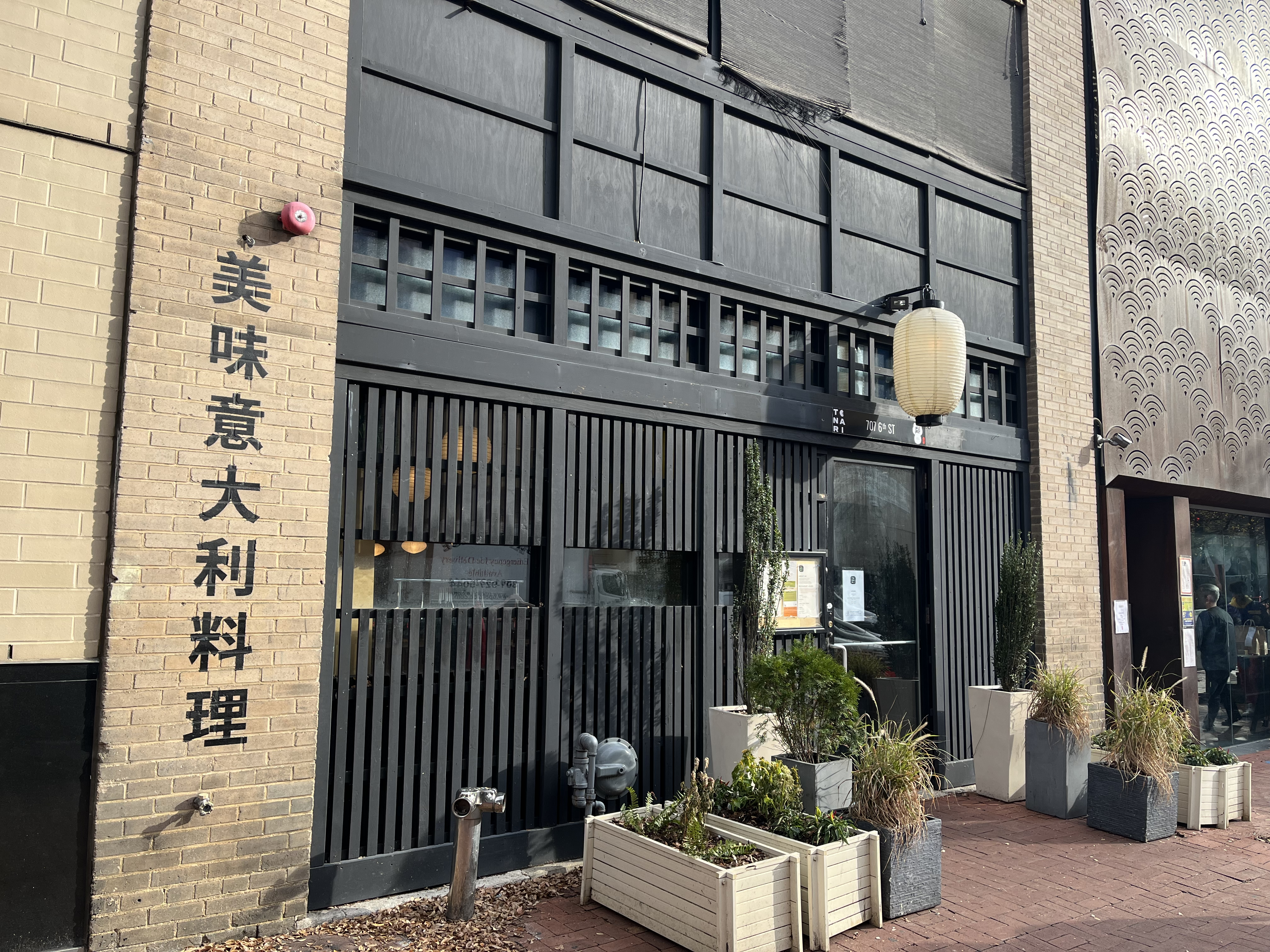
- Interactive map of Tonari

Restaurant information
- Chef: Katsuya Fukushima
- Location: 707 6th Street NW, Washington, D.C., 20001, United States
- Coordinates: 38°53′55.3″N 77°1′10.5″W

Tonari is a restaurant in Penn Quarter, Washington, D.C., United States. The business is operated by chef Katsuya Fukushima and the Daikaya Restaurant Group.
