= Fireman's Insurance Company Building =

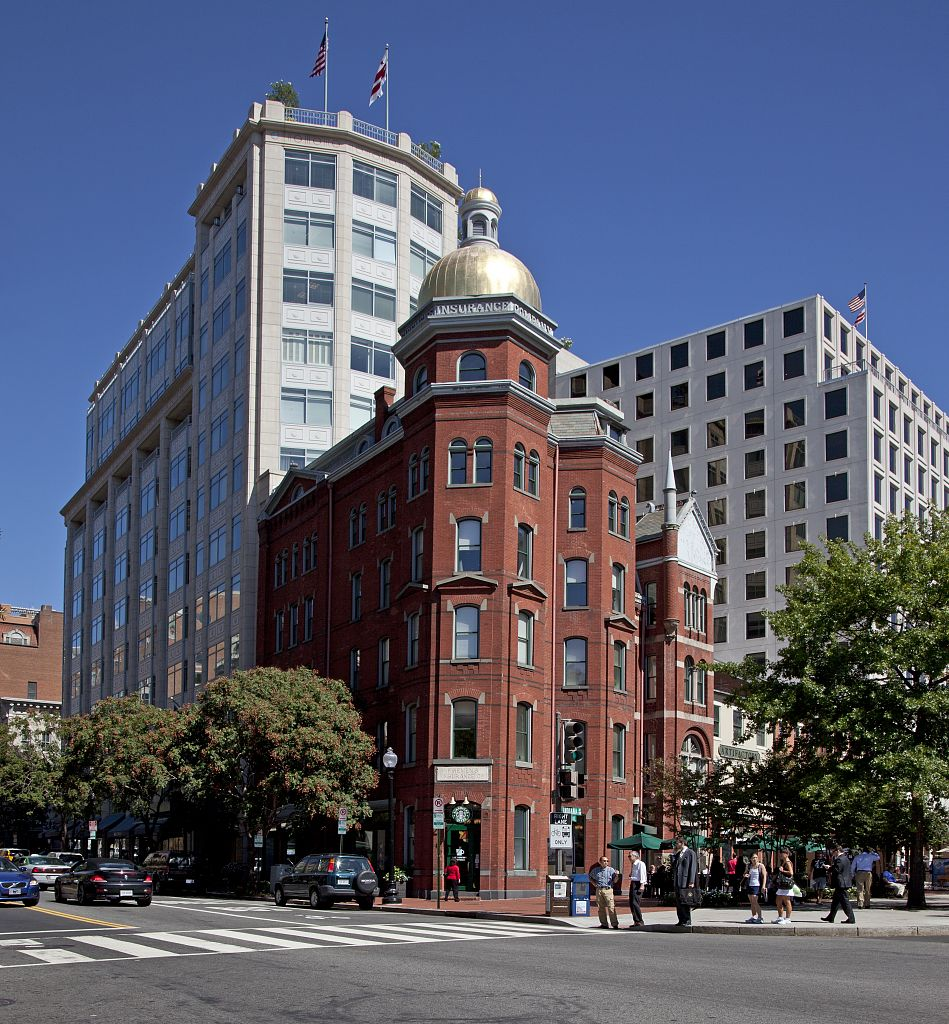
- The Fireman's Insurance Company Building

- Location within Central Washington, D.C.

General information
- Type: Office
- Location: 303 Seventh Street, N.W. Washington, D.C., United States
- Coordinates: 38.894154°N 77.021829°W
- Renovated: 1887

The Fireman's Insurance Company Building is an historic building in Washington, D.C. It is located in the Penn Quarter neighborhood, immediately across the street from the U.S. Navy Memorial and near the Stephenson Memorial as well as the historic Central National Bank building.

== History ==
The Queen Anne-style building, at 303 Seventh Street, N.W., was completed in 1882. Rather than being built in a more elaborate Queen Anne style common throughout many of Washington's neighborhoods, this building has a more restrained look. Instead of a conical roof, deep detail on the façade, and a colorful exterior, the building has only a golden cupola and dome, and a red-brick exterior with muted detail. The structure was built to fit into the corner created by Indiana Avenue and Seventh Street. The Fireman's Insurance Company owned the building through the 1950s.

The cupola was removed and much of the exterior was altered by the late-1960s. In the years after, the building was restored to an appearance very near its original, with the golden cupola and dome added to an appearance very close to the original. The exterior was also returned to its original red-brick look.

== Gallery ==
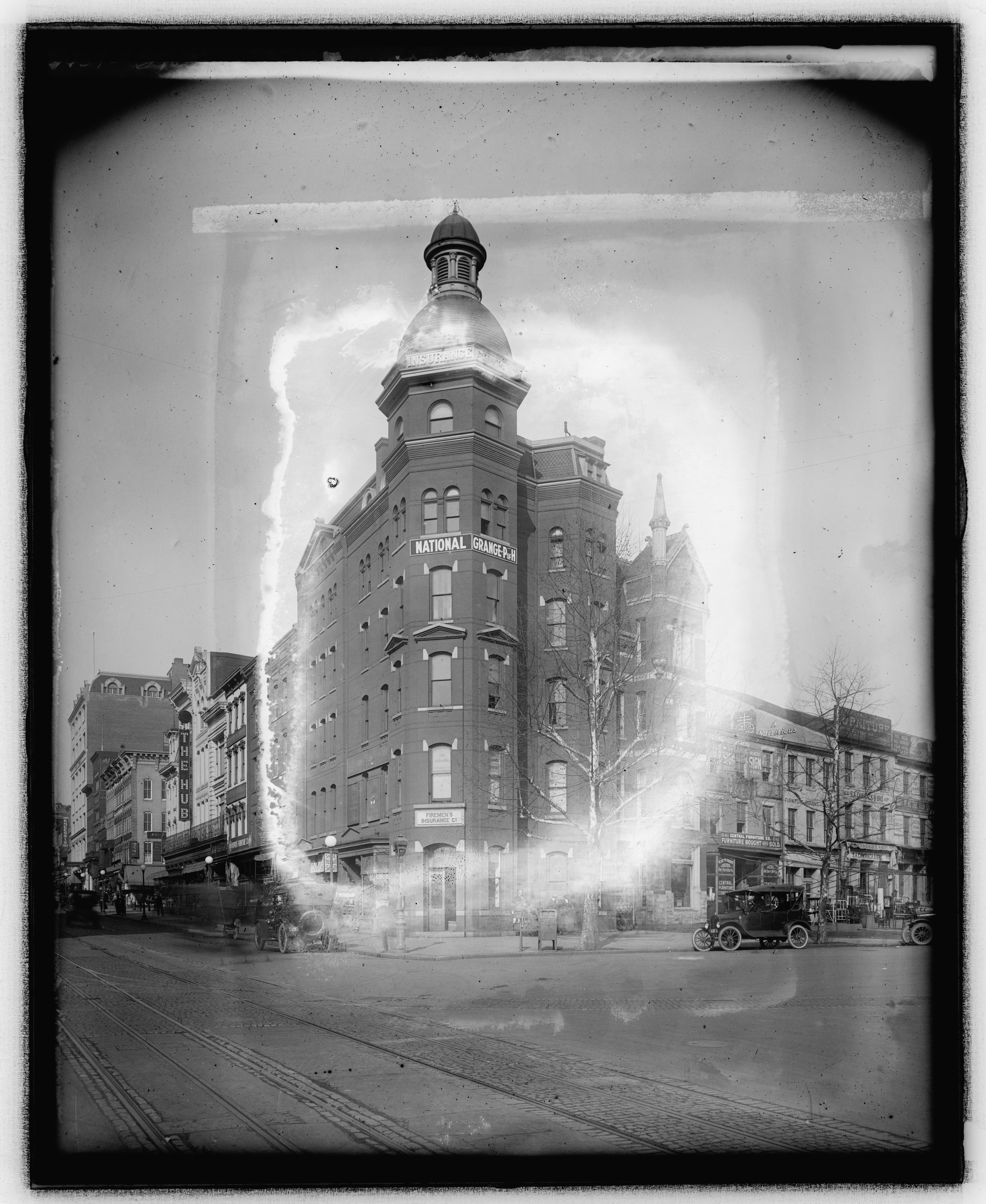
The building as it appeared in the early 1900s

The building in the early 1980s, with the dome and cupola removed as well as the exterior painted, before being restored to its original appearance.

The exterior partially restored, though the ground floor is still not restored and the golden dome and cupola have not been added.

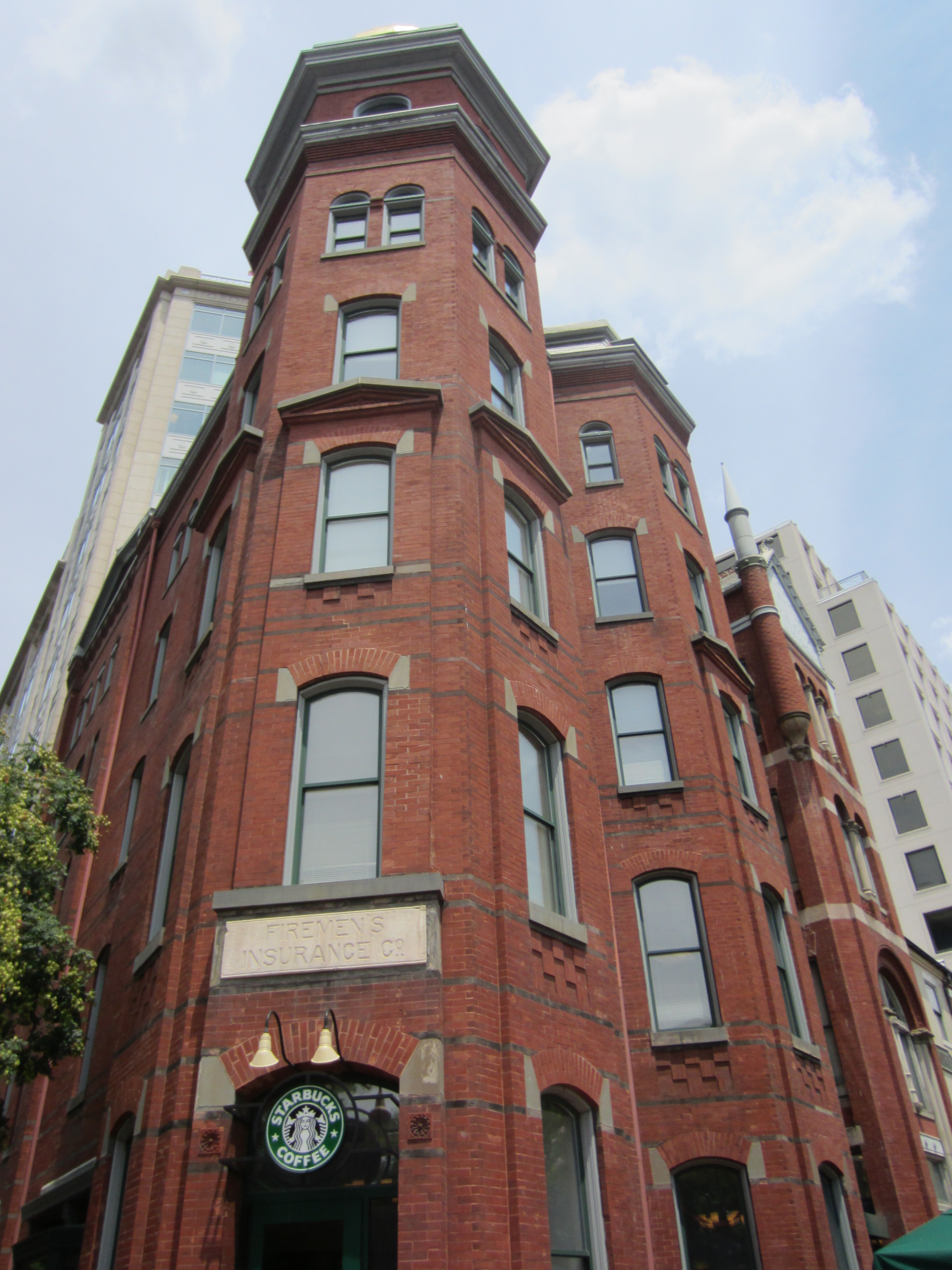
A close-up of the Starbucks on the ground floor.
