= Penn Quarter =

Neighborhood of Washington, D.C., United States

- Neighborhood of Washington, D.C.
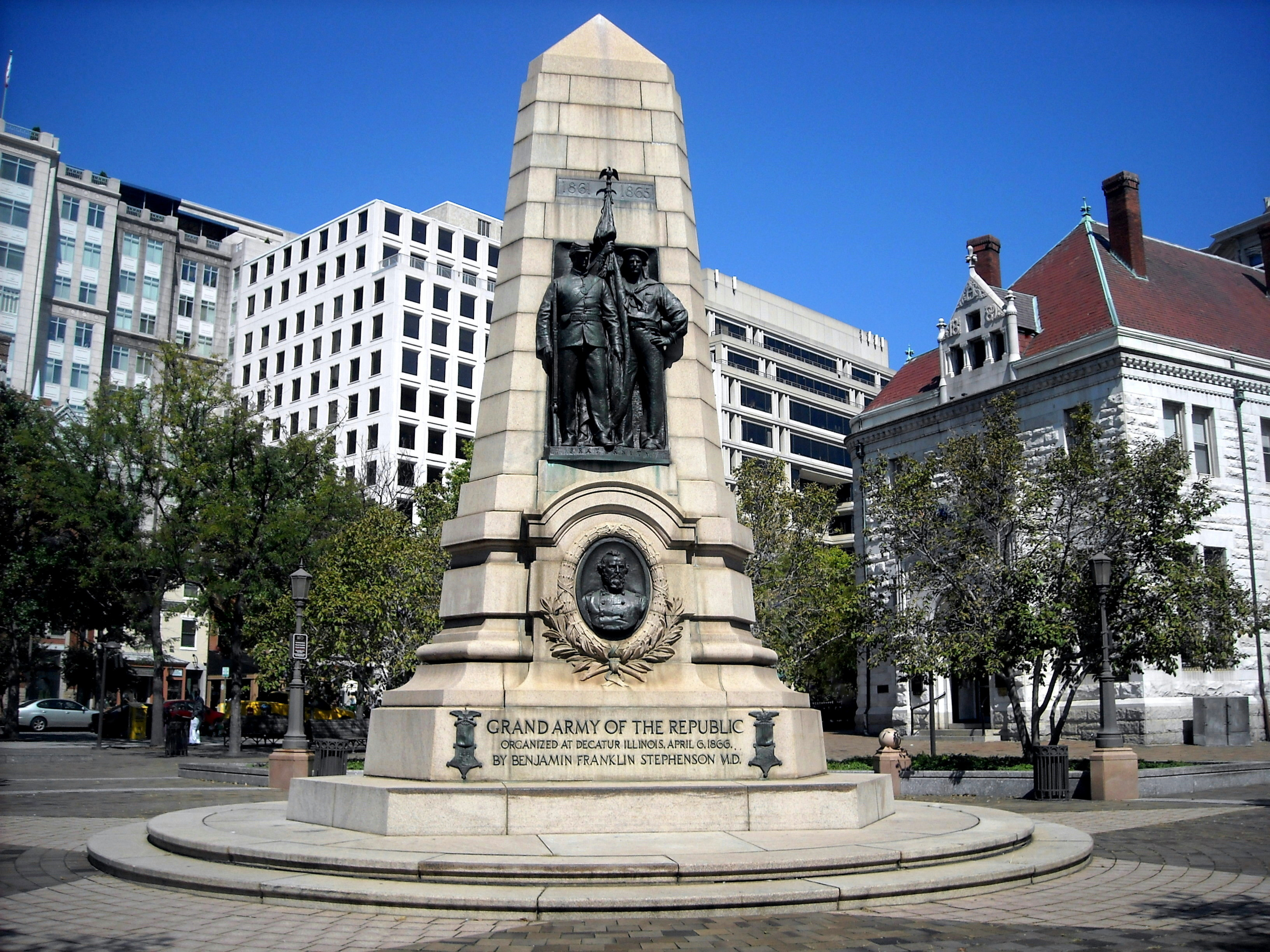
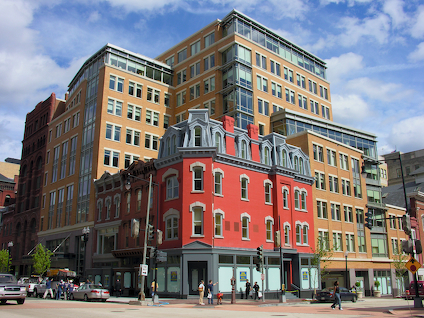
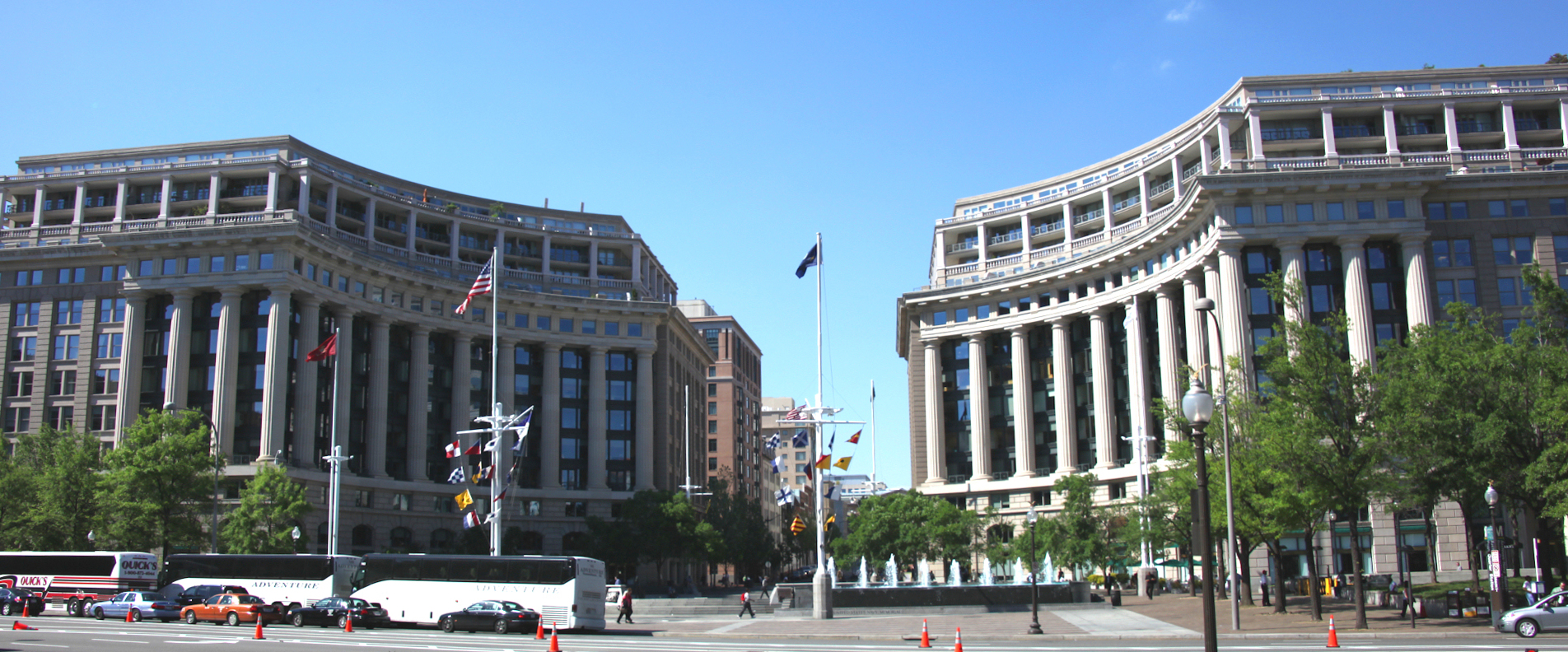
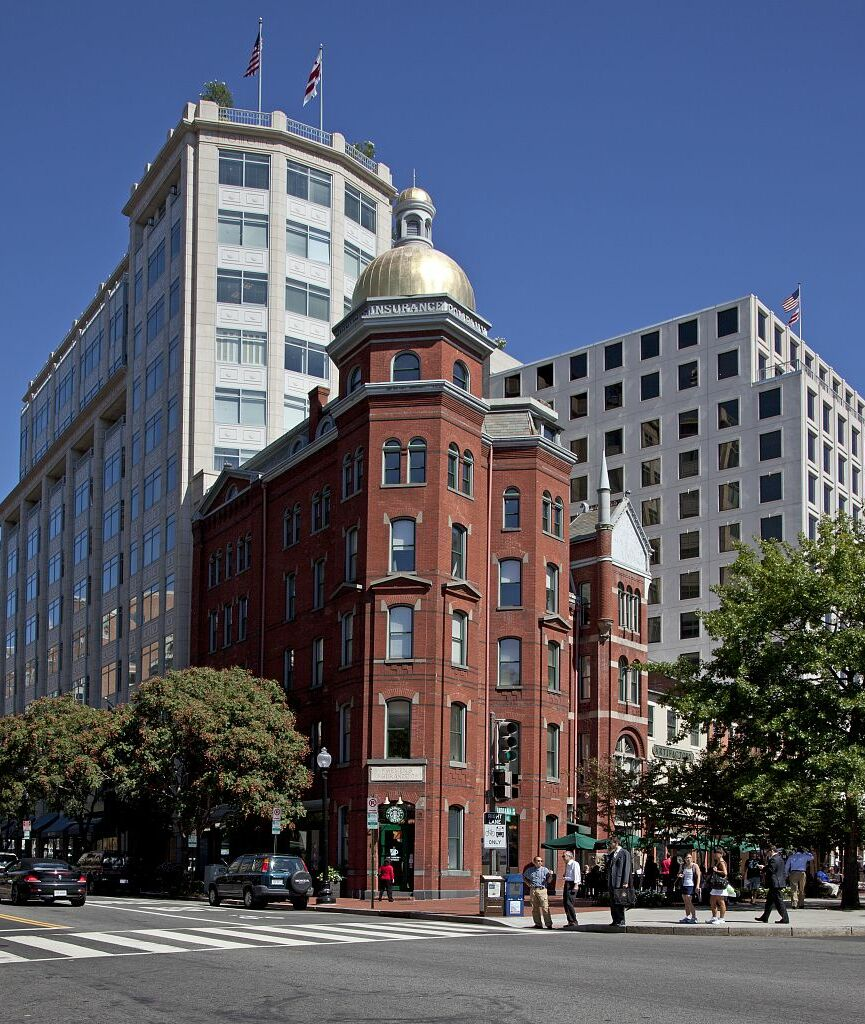
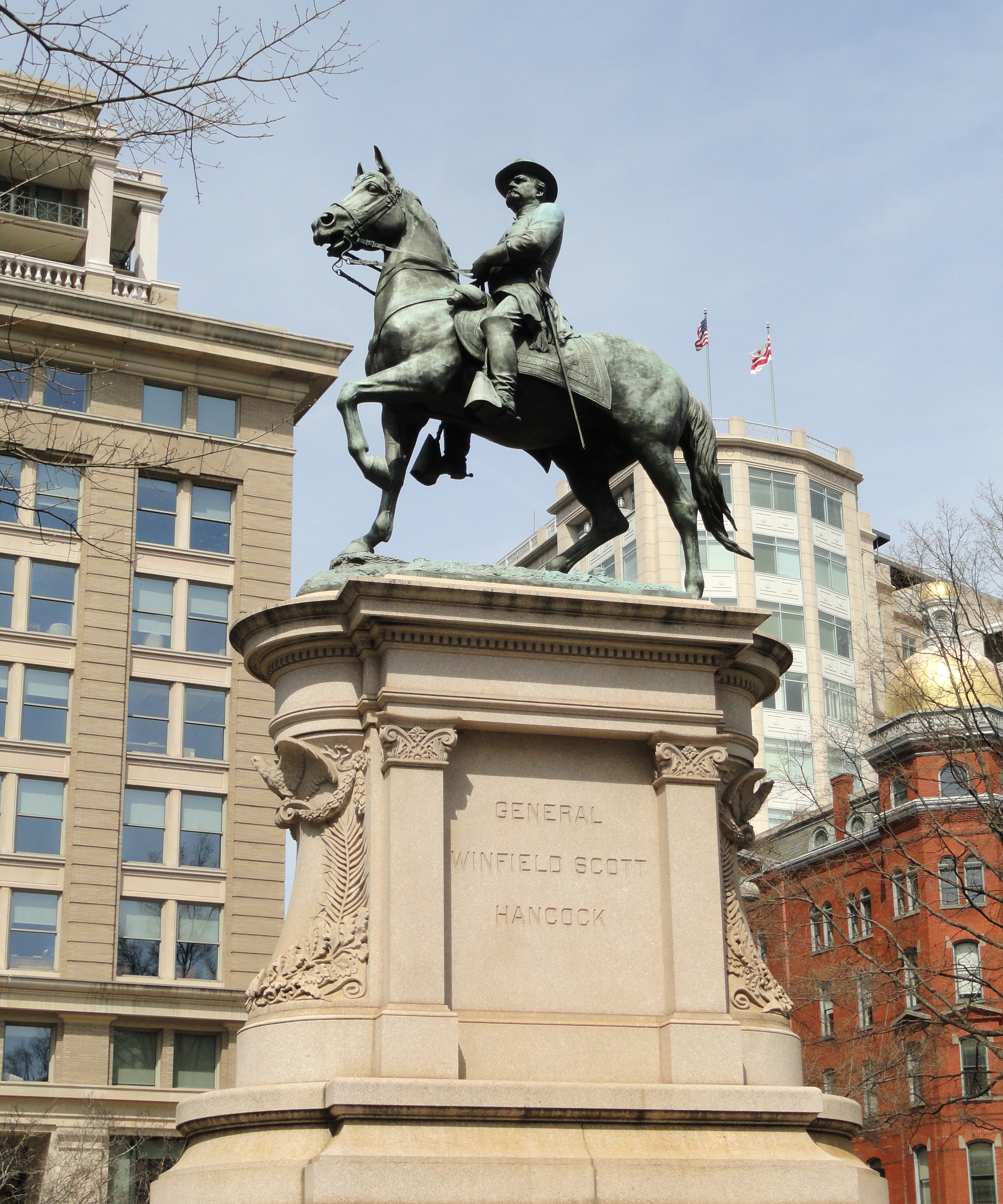
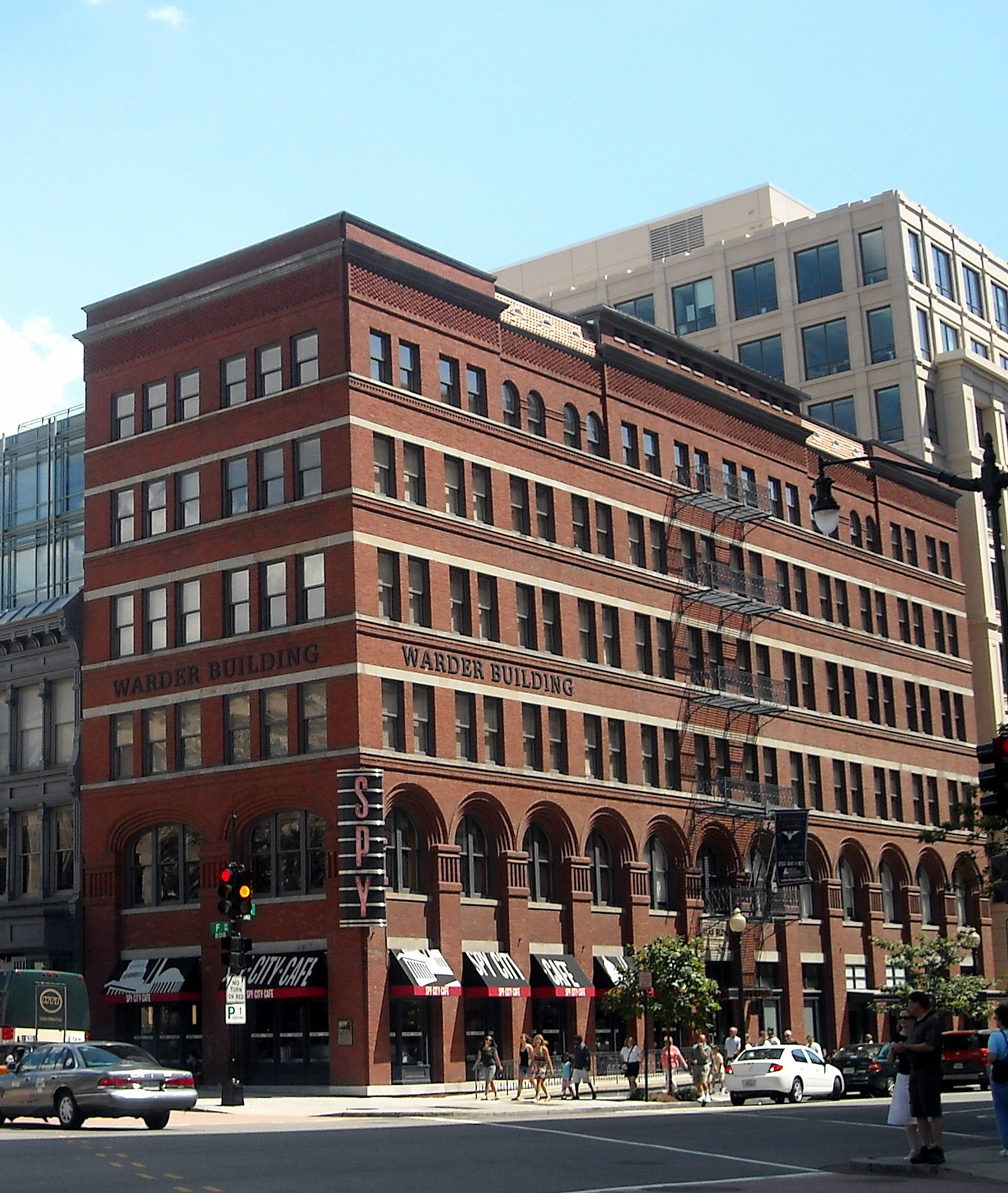
- Top: Stephenson Memorial (left) and F Street (right); middle: U.S. Navy Memorial; bottom: Fireman's Insurance Building (left), General Hancock statue (center), and International Spy Museum (right)

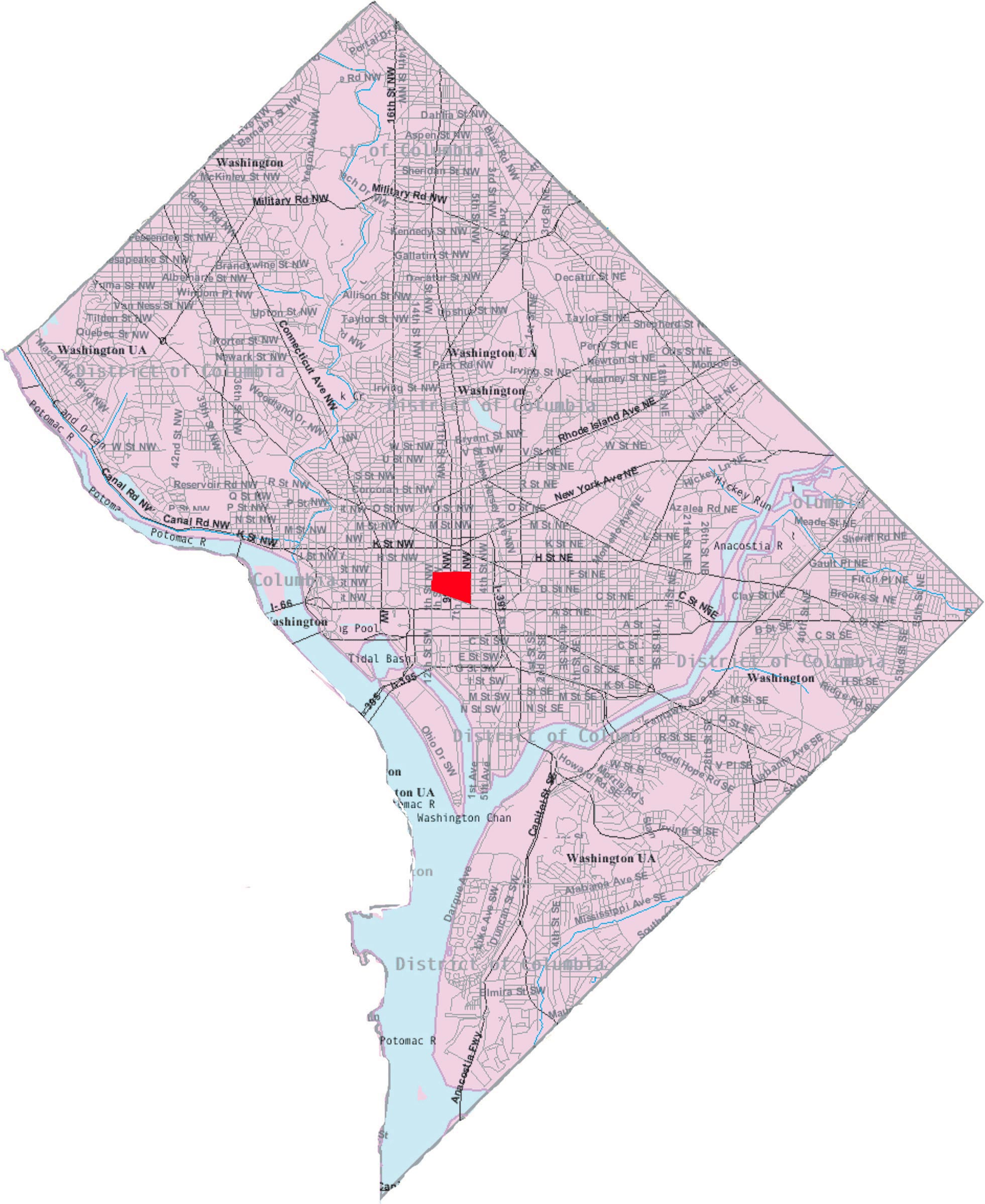
- Penn Quarter
- Coordinates: 38.8972°N 77.024°W
- Country: United States
- District: Washington, D.C.
- Quadrant: Northwest
- Ward: 2

Government
  - Councilmember: Brooke Pinto
- Postal code: ZIP code

Penn Quarter is a historic neighborhood of Downtown Washington, D.C., located north of Pennsylvania Avenue, in Northwest D.C. Penn Quarter is roughly equivalent to the city's early downtown core near Pennsylvania Avenue and 7th Street NW, Penn Quarter is an entertainment and commercial hub, home to many museums, theaters, cinemas, restaurants, bars, art galleries and retail shops. Landmarks include the Capital One Arena, the National Portrait Gallery, the Harman Center for the Arts, and others. The area is home to a popular farmers market and several food, wine, art, and culture focused festivals.

== Geography ==
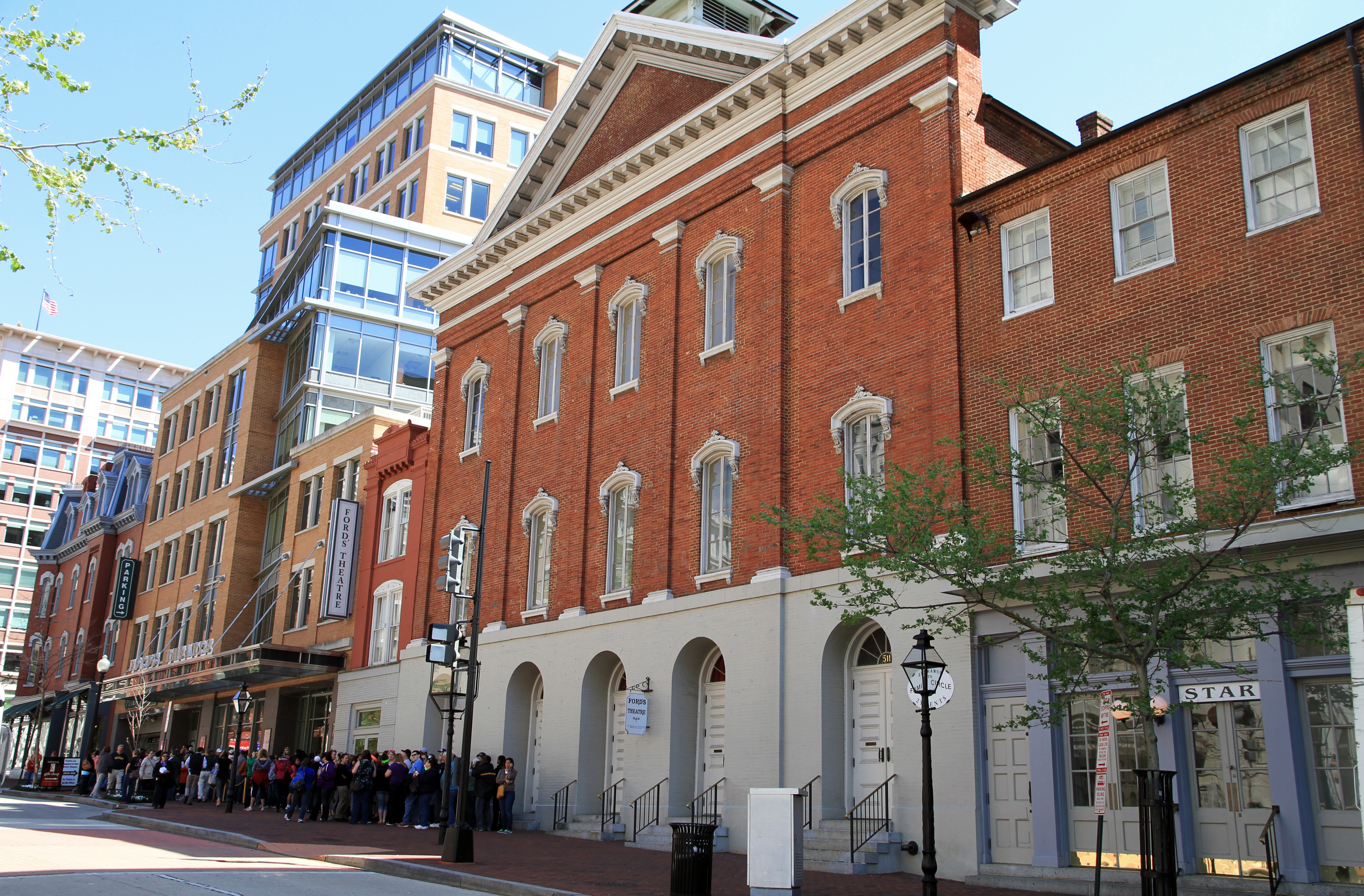
Ford's Theatre, the location of the assassination of Abraham Lincoln in 1865, is a National Historic Site and performing arts venue.

The boundaries of the Penn Quarter are not defined in any one single authoritative source, but are generally considered to extend along Pennsylvania Avenue NW from 5th to 10th Street and to approximately H Street NW on the north where Penn Quarter abuts or partially overlaps with Chinatown, thus including the east end of the F Street shopping district. Others would say that Chinatown is a subarea of Penn Quarter and Penn Quarter's more natural northern boundary streets are New York Avenue west of Mt. Vernon Square and Massachusetts Avenue, east of Mt. Vernon Square.

== Revitalization ==
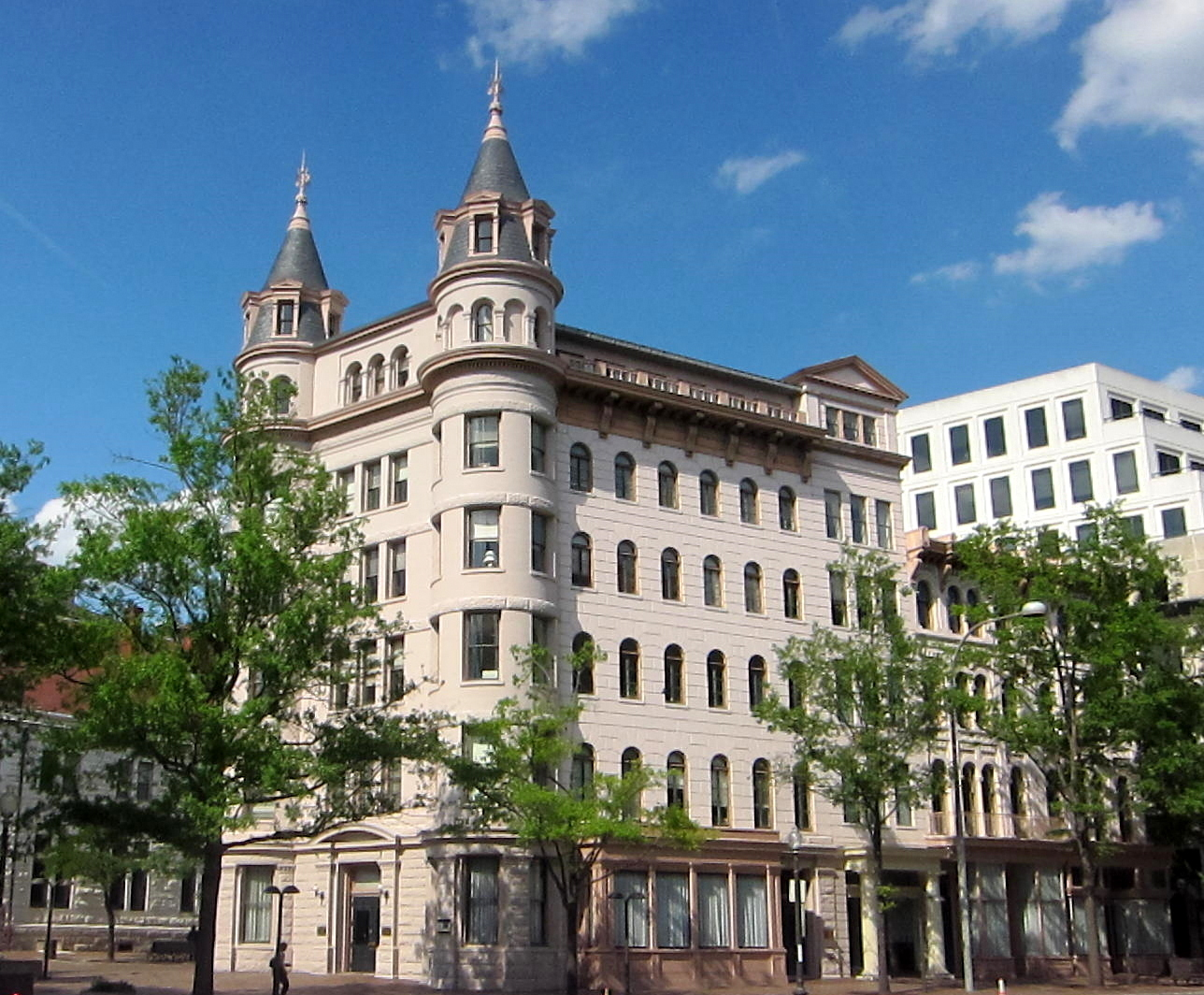
The National Council of Negro Women, housed in the Height Building

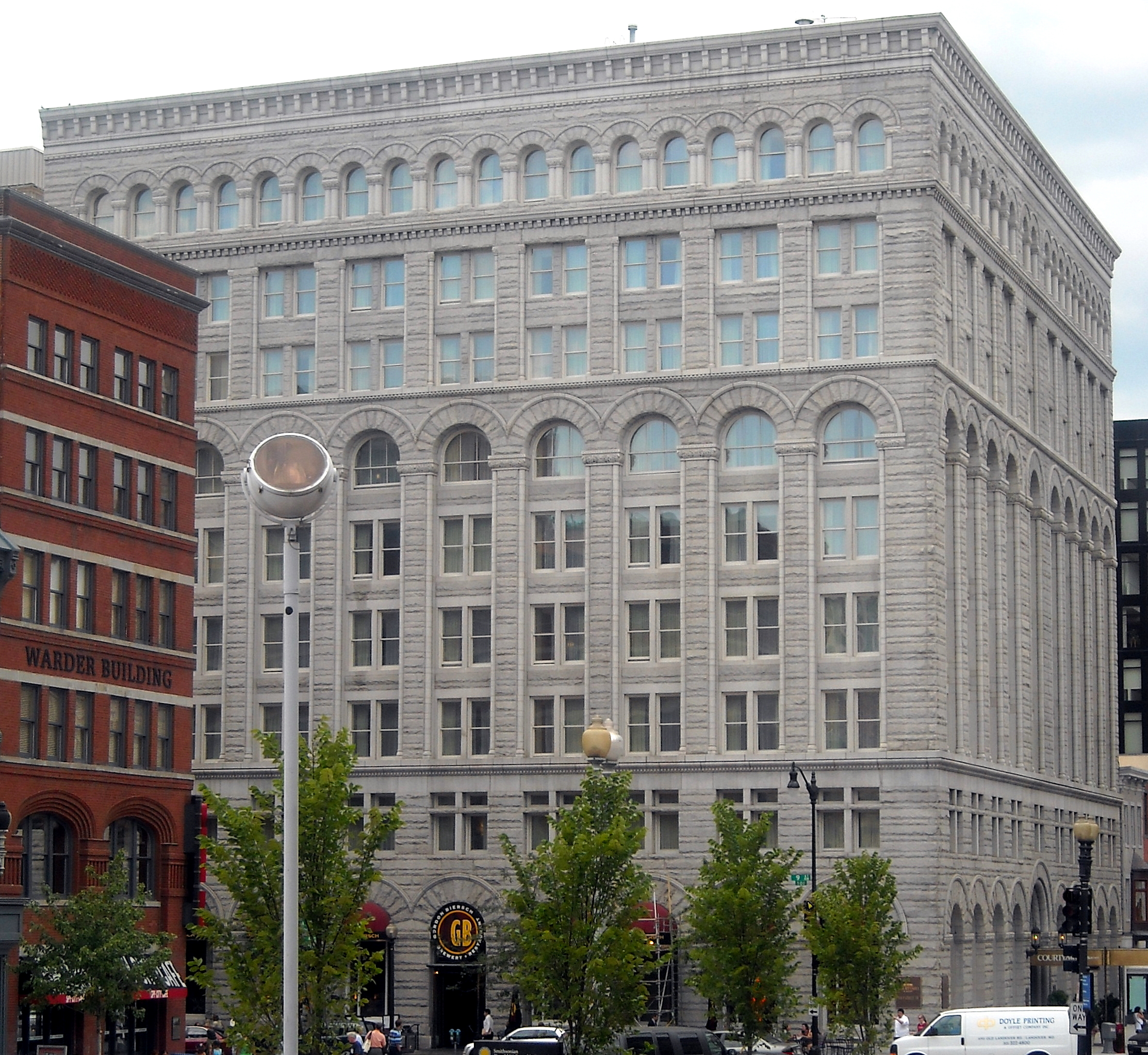
Riggs Hotel

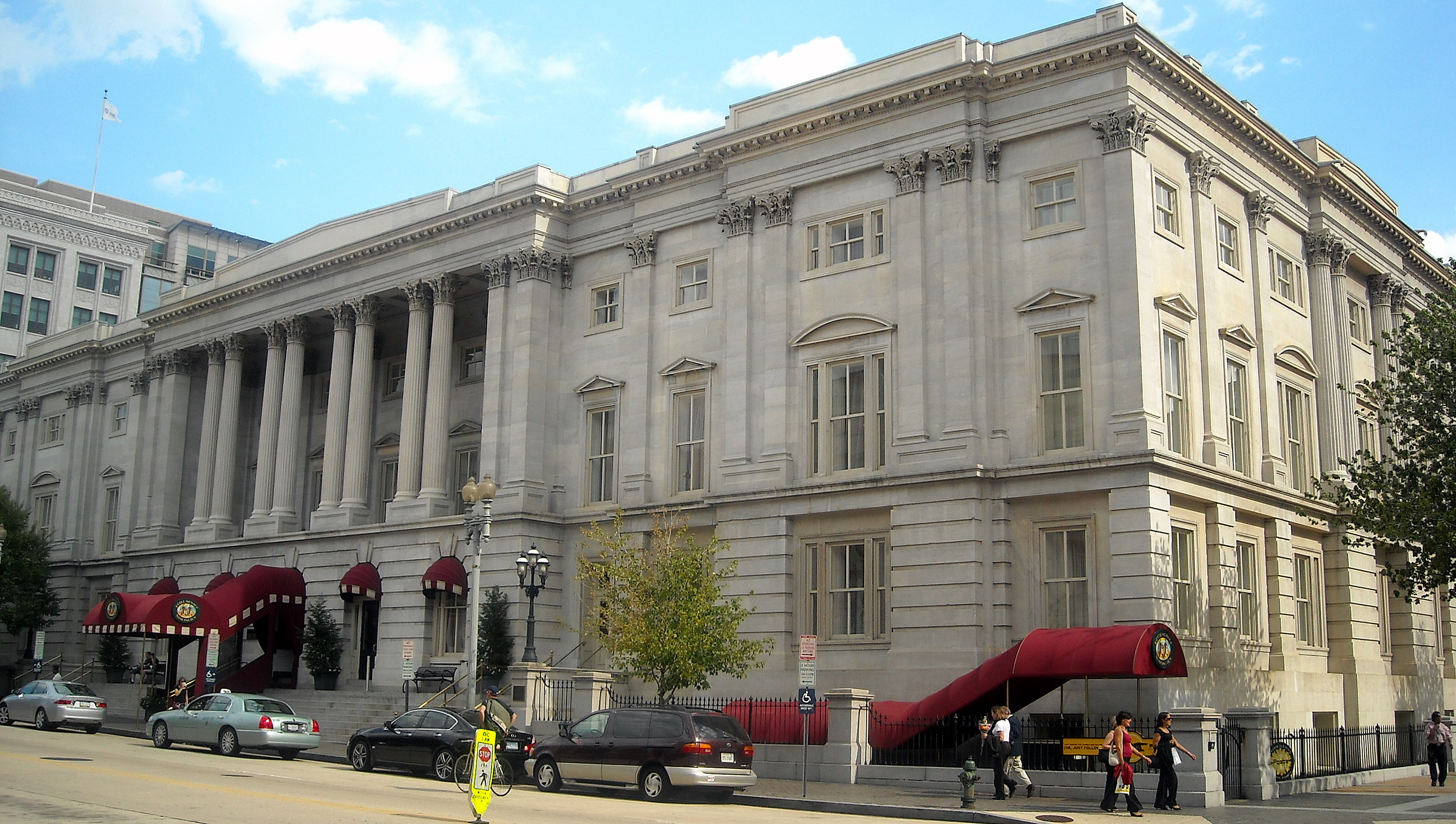
Kimpton Hotel Monaco, housed in the historic General Post Office

Penn Quarter's initial growth occurred under the auspices of the Pennsylvania Avenue Development Corporation whose Pennsylvania Avenue Plan called for a mixed-use neighborhood. It required development of new buildings and renovation of historic structures for residences, theaters and other cultural venues, shops, and restaurants, and also allowed hotels and office buildings with ground floor retail uses framing new parks, plazas, and upgraded pedestrian sidewalks along The Avenue.

West of Penn Quarter, revitalization started along Pennsylvania Avenue with three major developments: the Willard Intercontinental Hotel's renovation and expansion along with construction of a new adjacent office building between 14th and 15th streets; National Place, a mixed-use development that included offices, a major retail component, the JW Marriott Hotel, and a renovated National Theater between 13th and 14th streets; and the office building at 1001 Pennsylvania Avenue between 10th and 11th streets that incorporated the renovation of a significant number of historic buildings, all west of the FBI Building.

At the same time, PADC renovated and expanded Pershing Park, which faces the Willard and Washington hotels, between 14th and 15th streets, and created Freedom Plaza along The Avenue between 13th and 14th streets. East of the FBI, PADC created two additional parks: Market Square Park where the Navy Memorial is located between 7th and 9th streets, and John Marshall Park just east of the Canadian Embassy. Framing Market Square Park is the mixed use development of retail shops, restaurants, offices, and residences. More residences are immediately north at Market Square North, another mixed use development that also includes offices, shops, and a restaurant, and the renovated and expanded Lansburgh's, a former department store that is now a major apartment building with a theater and shops. The theater is home to the Shakespeare Theatre, a nationally renowned Shakespearean company. Although some existing buildings east of the FBI and smaller developments such as at the NE corner of 7th and D took place earlier on, the major developments that added cultural venues and residences to this area downtown after their absence for some hundred years did not begin in earnest until the mid-1980s.

The nearby Verizon Center, which opened in 1997, stimulated the revitalization of adjacent blocks to the north and east and was another sign that the Penn Quarter was a national model that other cities would look to for revitalizing America's downtowns. Recognition of the remarkable changes that had taken place in a major city's downtown was recognize by ULI - the Urban Land Institute in awarding both the Market Square development and PADC for the work each had accomplished. Penn Quarter became a model that other cities looked to for guidance when tackling downtown revitalization.

Penn Quarter is home to many restaurants, cultural, and entertainment venues. On Thursday afternoons in spring, summer, and fall, a farmers’ market is open on the F Street, NW sidewalk between 7th and 9th streets, in front of the National Portrait Gallery and the Smithsonian American Art Museum. Freedom Forum had moved its Newseum from Arlington, VA., to a new building on the site along Pennsylvania Avenue at 6th Street next to the Canadian Embassy. At the end of December 2018 it closed the museum and arranged to sell the site and building, which includes offices and residences, to Johns Hopkins University.

== Landmarks ==
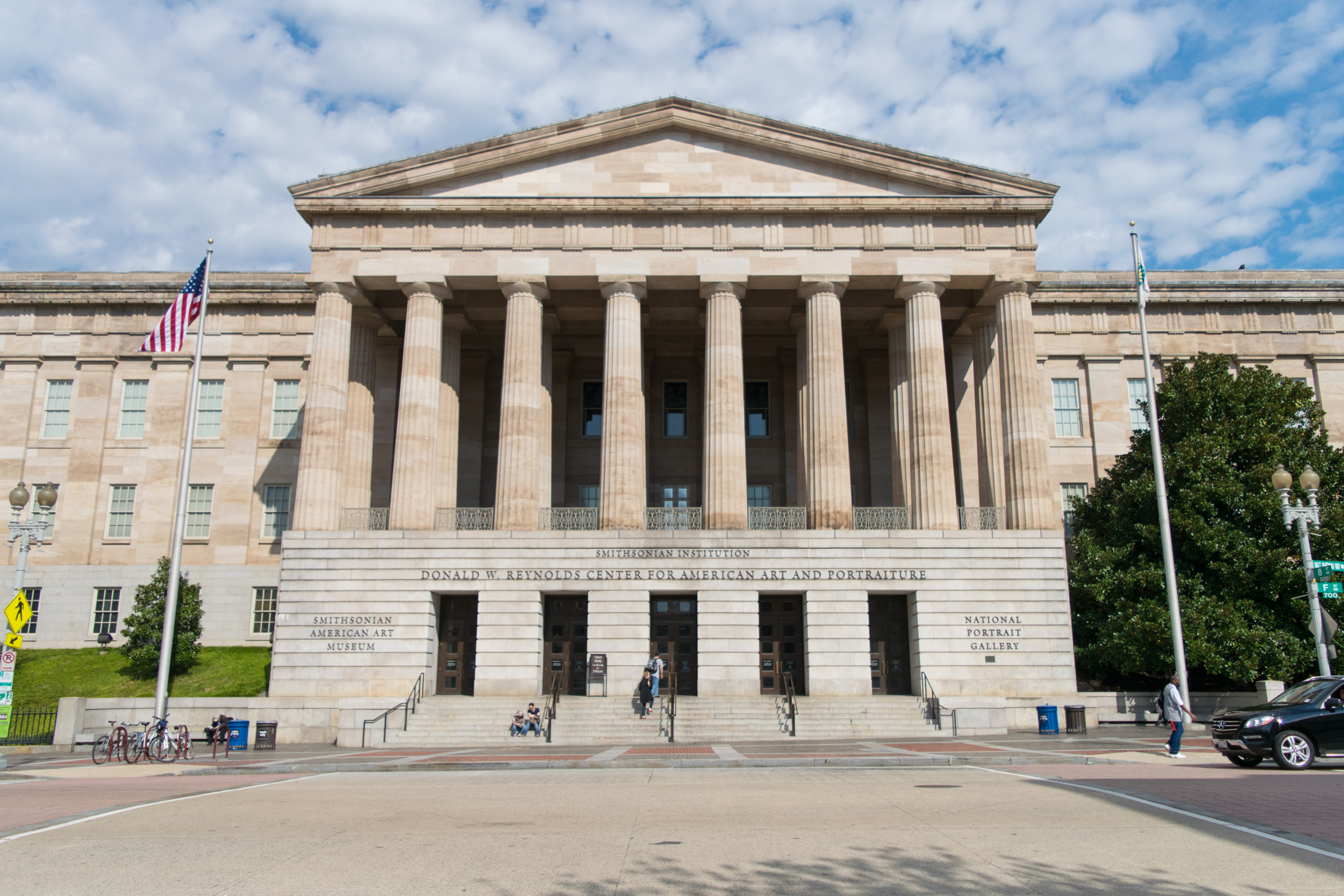
National Portrait Gallery

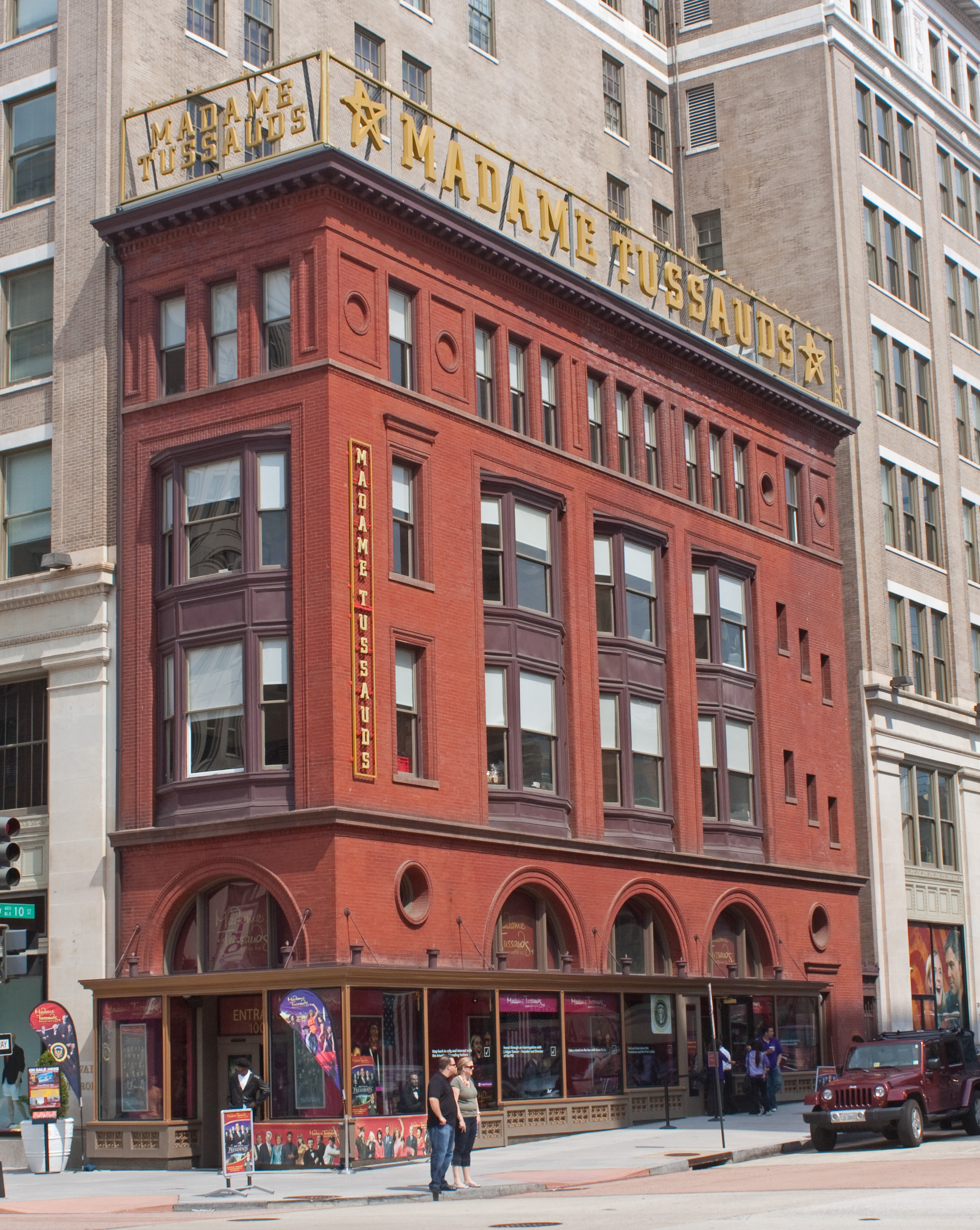
Madame Tussauds Washington

Attractions located in or near Penn Quarter include:

- Calvary Baptist Church
- Canadian Embassy
- Capital One Arena
- Ford's Theatre & Booth Alley
- J. Edgar Hoover Building – FBI headquarters
- Lansburgh's historic flagship department store building – now defunct. The building is part of The Lansburgh Apartment building.
- Madame Tussauds Washington D.C.
- Marian Koshland Science Museum – National Academy of Sciences
- National Museum of Women in the Arts
- National Building Museum
- National Portrait Gallery
- Petersen House
- Shakespeare Theatre Company at the Harman Center for the Arts – includes the Lansburgh Theatre and Sidney Harman Hall
- Smithsonian American Art Museum
- Surratt House – now Wok 'n Roll Restaurant
- U.S. Navy Memorial
- Woolly Mammoth Theatre Company

== Transportation ==
Penn Quarter is served by the Archives-Navy Memorial-Penn Quarter, Metro Center, Judiciary Square, and Gallery Place-Chinatown Metro stations and Metrobus.
