= Central National Bank Building (Peoria, Illinois) =

- U.S. National Register of Historic Places
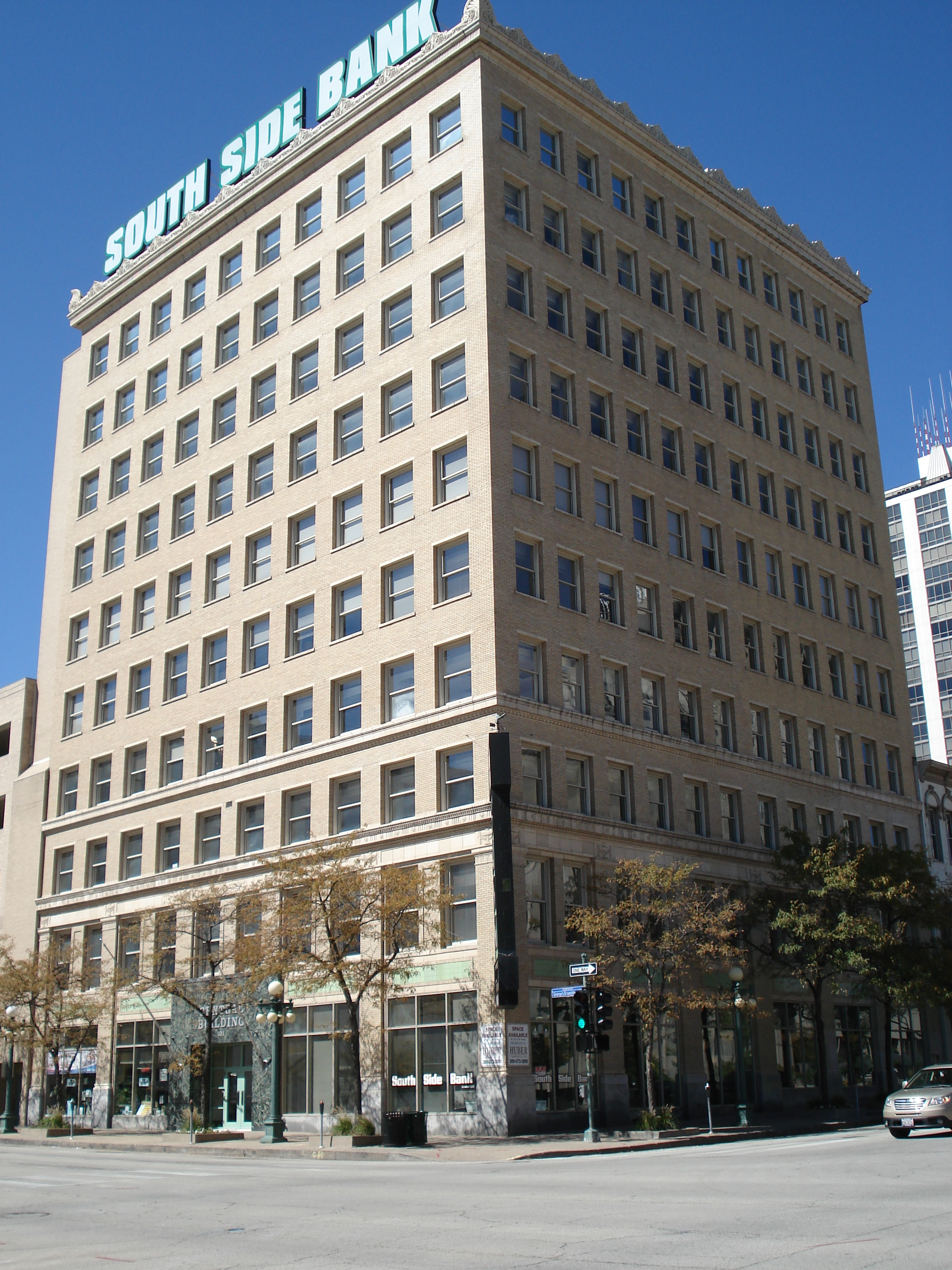
- The Central Building as a South Side Bank branch, 2006

- Location within Peoria County, Illinois
- Location: 103 SW Adams St., Peoria, Illinois
- Coordinates: 40°41′30″N 89°35′24″W
- Area: less than one acre
- Built: 1913-1914
- Architect: G.R. Graham, P. Anderson, Edward Probst (D.H. Burnham Company)
- Architectural style: Renaissance Revival
- NRHP reference No.: 78003450
- Added to NRHP: December 18, 1978

The Central National Bank Building, also known as the Central Building, is a ten-story building located at 103 Southwest Adams Street in downtown Peoria, Illinois, United States. It was designed by the architectural firm of Daniel Burnham in 1913–1914; Burnham himself had died two years before its completion, and at the time his office was the largest architecture firm in the world. The building has a Renaissance Revival design, a popular style at the time. The design features pilasters dividing the windows on the first two floors, spandrels above the first-floor windows, and terra cotta cornice lines above the second and third floors.

The building was added to the National Register of Historic Places on December 18, 1978.
