= BancCentral National Association =

- Central National Bank
- U.S. National Register of Historic Places
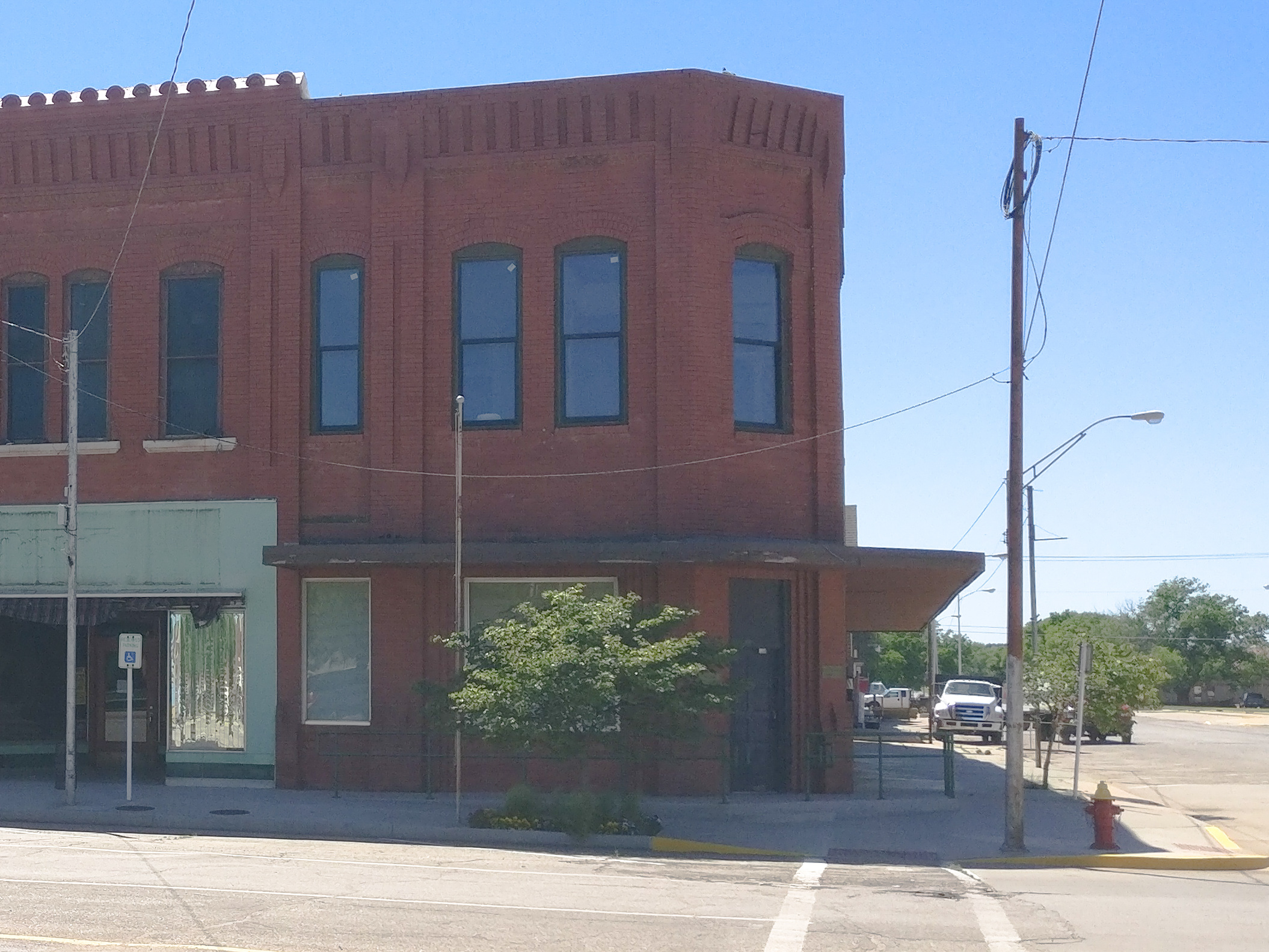
- This image is of the College Avenue facing (taken from the east side of the street camera facing the west) side of the Historic Central National Bank building in Alva, OK., Saturday, May 6, 2017. Currently this building houses the Sutter Law Office.

- Location within Oklahoma Location within the United States
- Location: 401 College Ave., Alva, Oklahoma
- Coordinates: 36°48′17″N 98°39′1″W
- Built: 1901
- Architectural style: Plains Commercial
- MPS: Territorial Buildings in Downtown Alva TR
- NRHP reference No.: 84000705
- Added to NRHP: January 5, 1984

The historic bank building located in Alva, Oklahoma is currently occupied by Dream First Bank, which operates a retail banking branch from the structure. The building itself is historically known as BancCentral National Association, formerly Central National Bank, and has housed multiple banking institutions over the course of its history.

BancCentral National Association (formerly Central National Bank) refers to a historic commercial bank building located in Alva, Oklahoma. The building was constructed in 1901 and was listed on the National Register of Historic Places in 1984. The structure historically housed several banking institutions operating under different names during the twentieth century.

== History ==
=== Early banking history ===
Banking operations associated with the building date back to the late nineteenth century. The Alva National Bank was established in 1899. By 1907, officers of Alva National Bank included George A. Harbaugh as president and J.H. Schaefer as vice president. Between 1907 and 1913, the Alva Security Bank acquired Alva National Bank, with Harbaugh continuing as president.

In August 1913, G.A. Harbaugh, E. Anderson, T.F. Fennessey, and H.E. Noble, owners of Alva Security Bank, organized a new banking institution under the name Central State Bank. The newly formed bank continued operations at the same location. Central State Bank was considered a state bank, with deposits insured by the Depositors Guaranty of the State of Oklahoma.

On October 31, 1917, Central State Bank absorbed the Woods County Union Bank. Harbaugh and George Meade held controlling stock in the Union Bank at that time.

=== Twentieth-century ownership ===
In 1919, W.D. Myers acquired a significant interest in the bank and became its president, a position he held until his death in 1951. Gertrude Myers later became chair of the board and chief executive officer. Following her death, their son, W.D. Myers Jr., assumed the presidency and served until his death in 1987. William R. Buckles was elected president thereafter, with W.D. Myers Jr. continuing as chair of the board until his death.

During the late twentieth century, the institution underwent additional changes associated with mergers and acquisitions within the regional banking industry. In 1998, the Woodward County branches of NationsBankwere acquired by Central National Bank. These transactions followed a series of earlier mergers, including the sale of the Bank of Woodward to Bank IV in Wichita, Kansas, in 1993.

=== Name change and later developments ===
In March 2012, the bank changed its name to BancCentral National Association (BancCentral, N.A.).

In March 2021, the Office of the Comptroller of the Currency issued a consent order related to the bank’s management and operational practices. The order outlined corrective actions addressing governance, risk management, and lending practices. The board of directors formally agreed to implement the required changes later that year.

== Architecture ==
The building was constructed in 1901 and is representative of early twentieth-century commercial architecture in Alva, Oklahoma. It features a brick exterior and design elements typical of commercial bank buildings of the period. The structure contributes to the historic character of downtown Alva and reflects the city’s early economic development.

== National Register of Historic Places ==
The building was added to the National Register of Historic Places on January 5, 1984, under reference number 84000705. The designation recognizes the building’s historical significance as a long-standing financial institution and its architectural integrity.

== Current use ==
As of the 2020s, the historic bank building is occupied by Dream First Bank, a community bank operating a retail branch from the structure. The building continues to serve a banking function while remaining part of Alva’s historic downtown district.
