= Central National Bank (Washington, D.C.) =

Historic building in the District of Columbia, United States

- U.S. National Register of Historic Places
- U.S. Historic district – Contributing property
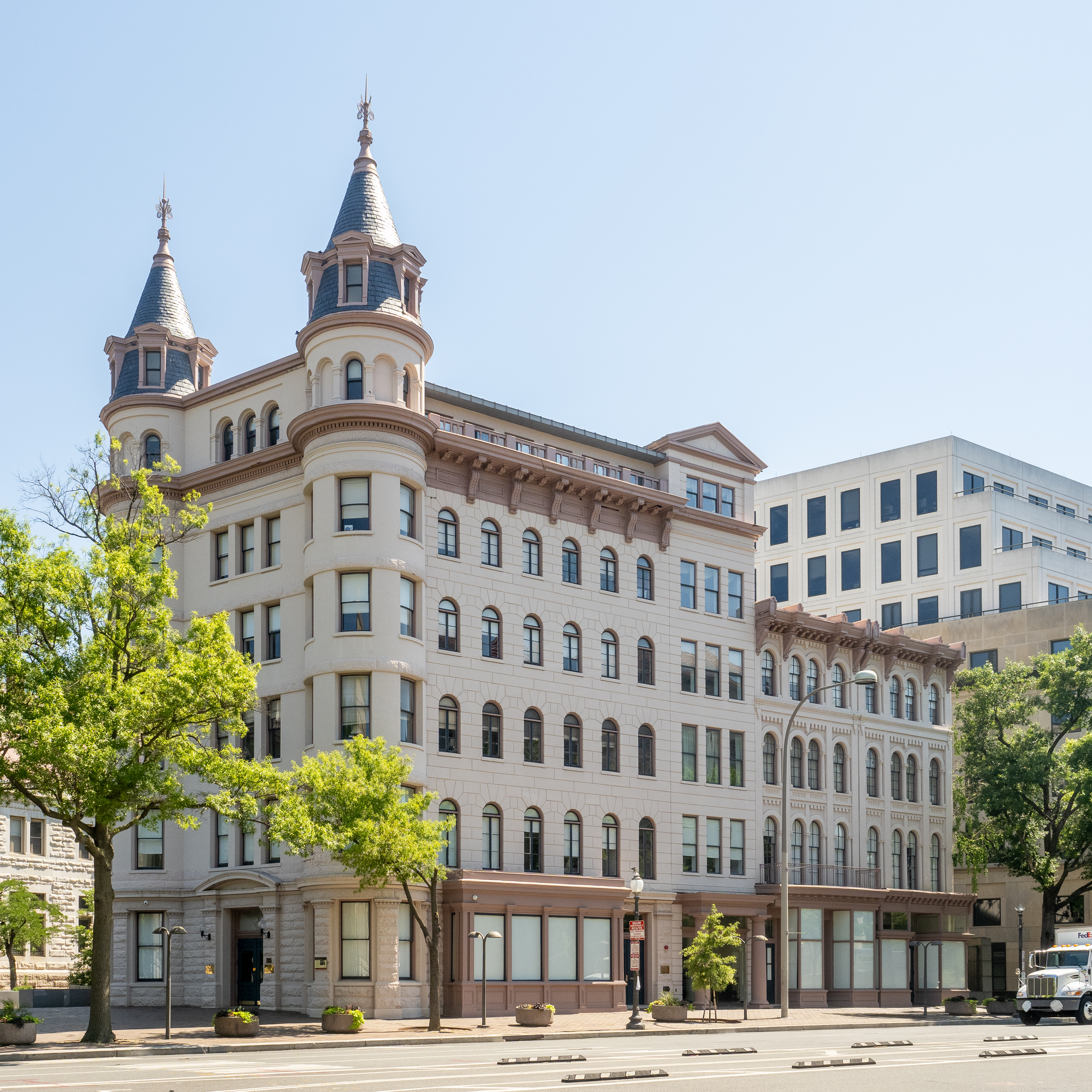
- Dorothy I. Height Building in 2024

- Location within Washington, D.C.
- Location: 633 Pennsylvania Avenue, N.W. Washington, D.C.
- Coordinates: 38°53′36.2″N 77°01′16.3″W
- Built: 1860
- Architect: Alfred B. Mullett
- Architectural style: Late Victorian
- Part of: Pennsylvania Avenue National Historic Site (ID66000865)
- MPS: Banks and Financial Institutions MPS
- NRHP reference No.: 95000526
- Added to NRHP: April 27, 1995

The Central National Bank, also known as the Dorothy I. Height Building, or Apex Building, is the national headquarters of the National Council of Negro Women. It is located at 633 Pennsylvania Avenue, Northwest, Washington, D.C., in the Penn Quarter neighborhood. The building in its current configuration is named for civil rights activist Dorothy Height.

== History ==
Built in 1860, it operated as the St. Marc Hotel. It was purchased by the Central National Bank, and the west front was renovated in 1887, to the designs of architect Alfred B. Mullett. In 1945, the ground floor was leased by the Apex Liquor store. In 1984, it was renovated by Sears.

The Late Victorian-style Dorothy I. Height Building is listed on the National Register of Historic Places. In addition, the building is designated as a contributing property to the Pennsylvania Avenue National Historic Site and the Downtown Historic District.

== Gallery ==
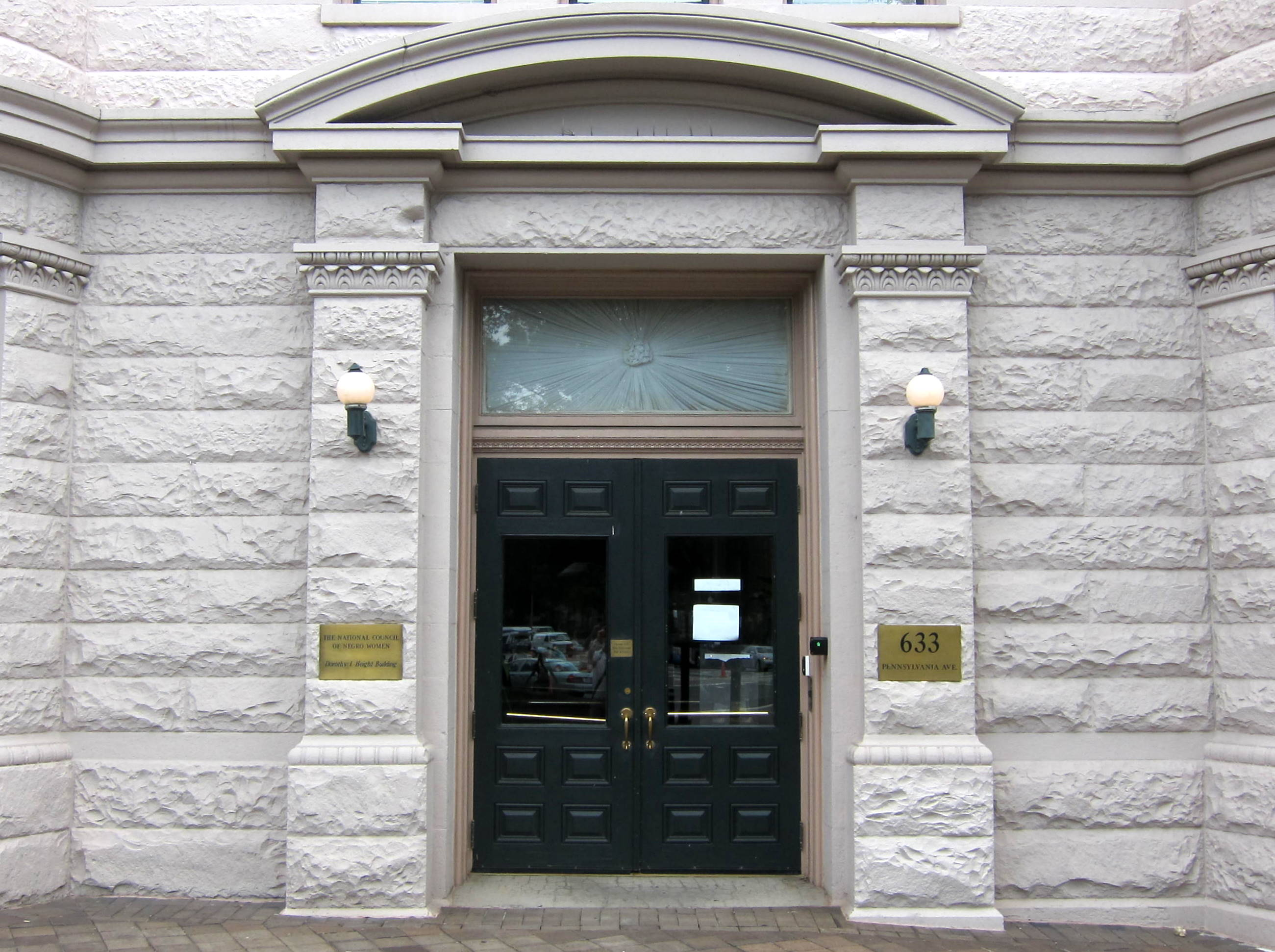
Entrance

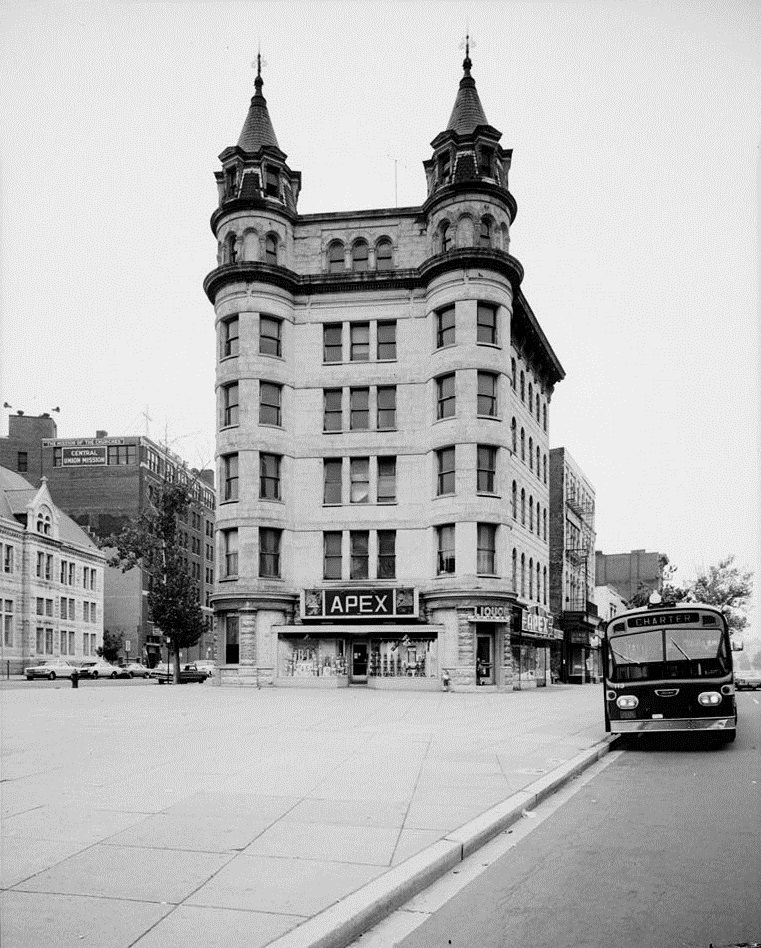
Apex Liquor Store, 1967

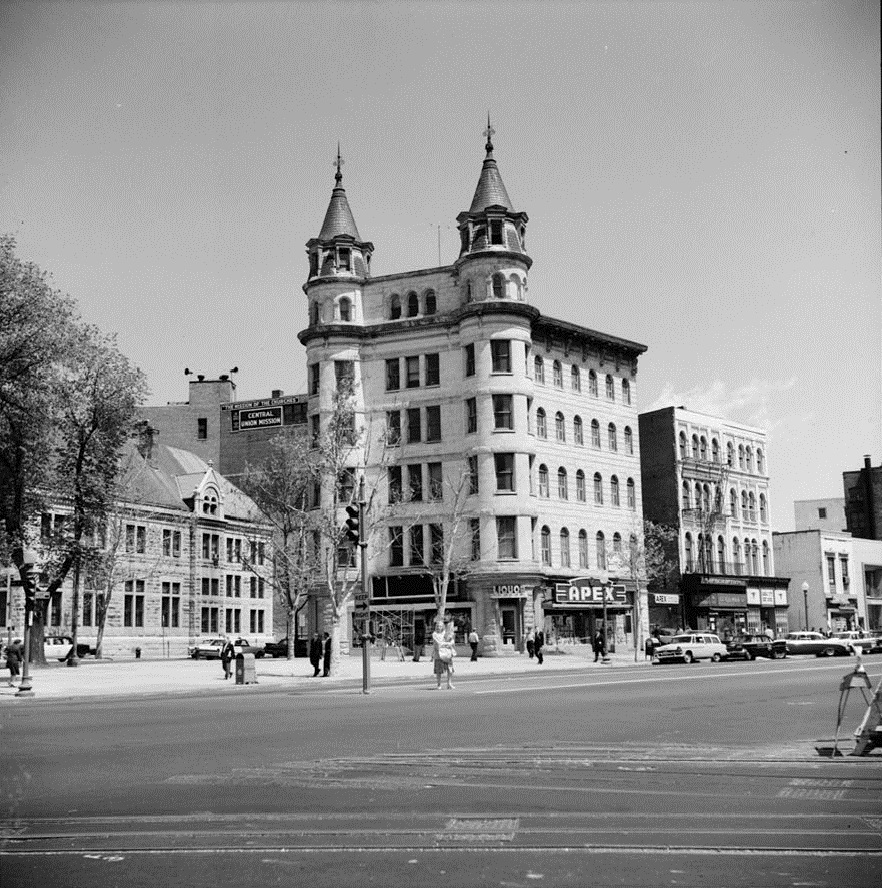
Apex Liquor Store in the mid-twentieth century
