= Baker Creek (Washington) =

Stream that flows through Whatcom County, Washington

Coordinates: 48°46′29″N 122°29′28″W

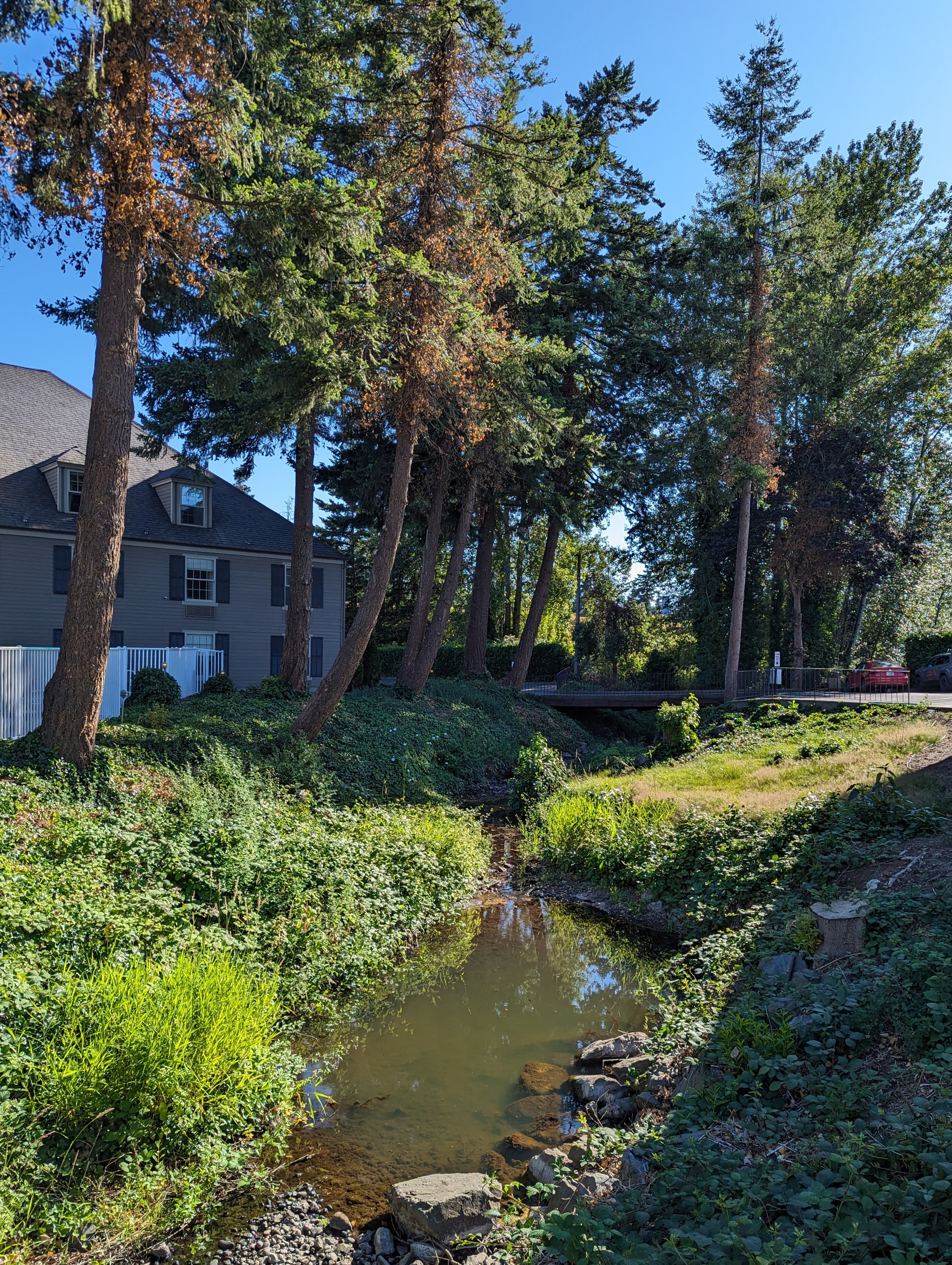
Baker Creek, where it runs between buildings of the Wingate Heritage Inn, Bellingham

Baker Creek is a stream that flows through Whatcom County, Washington. It is a tributary to Squalicum Creek, which flows through Bellingham, Washington, to Squalicum Waterway in Bellingham Bay.

In 2006, the city of Bellingham completed a significant stream and salmon habitat restoration project on Baker Creek.

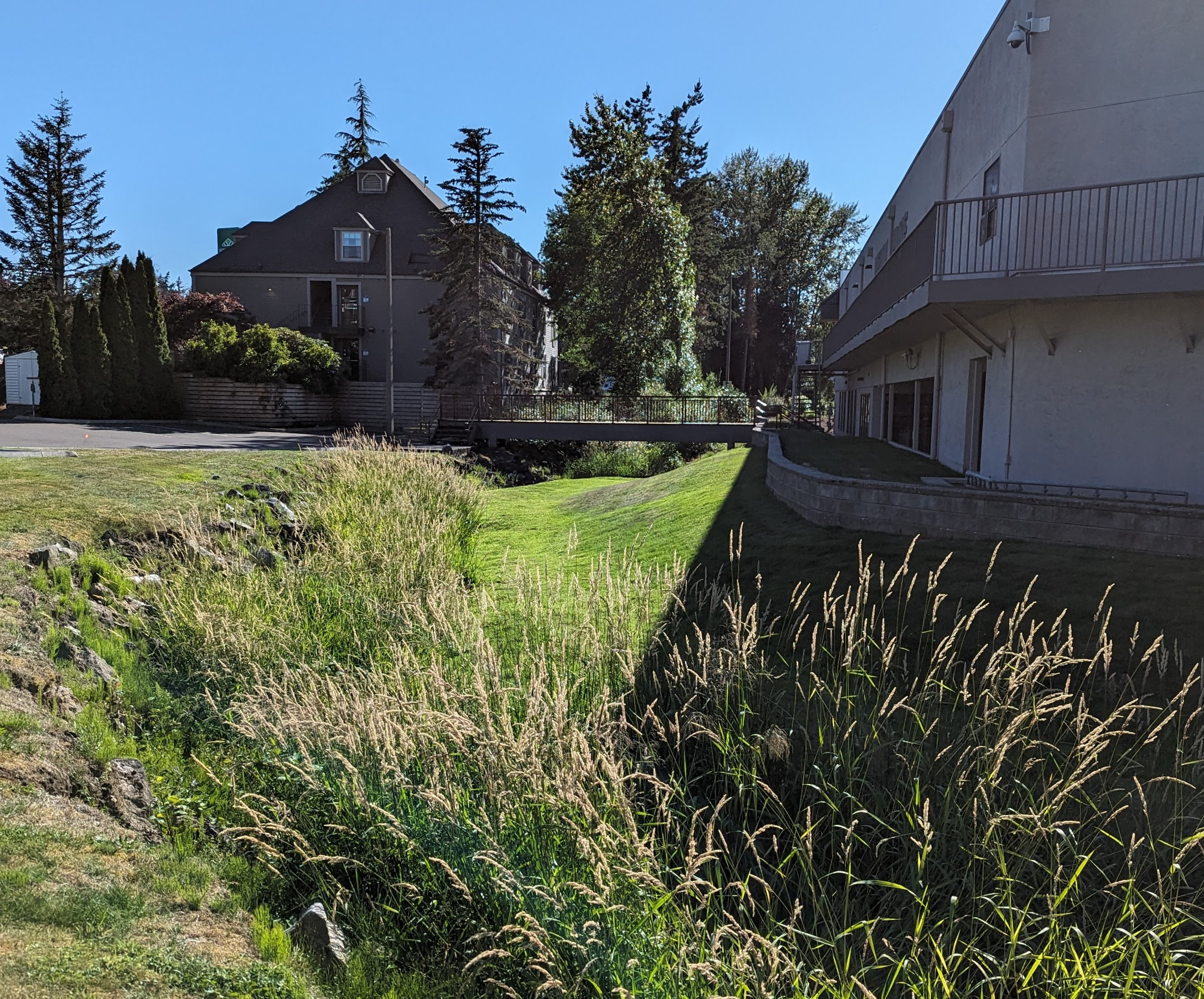
Baker Creek behind Meridian Place strip mall, Bellingham

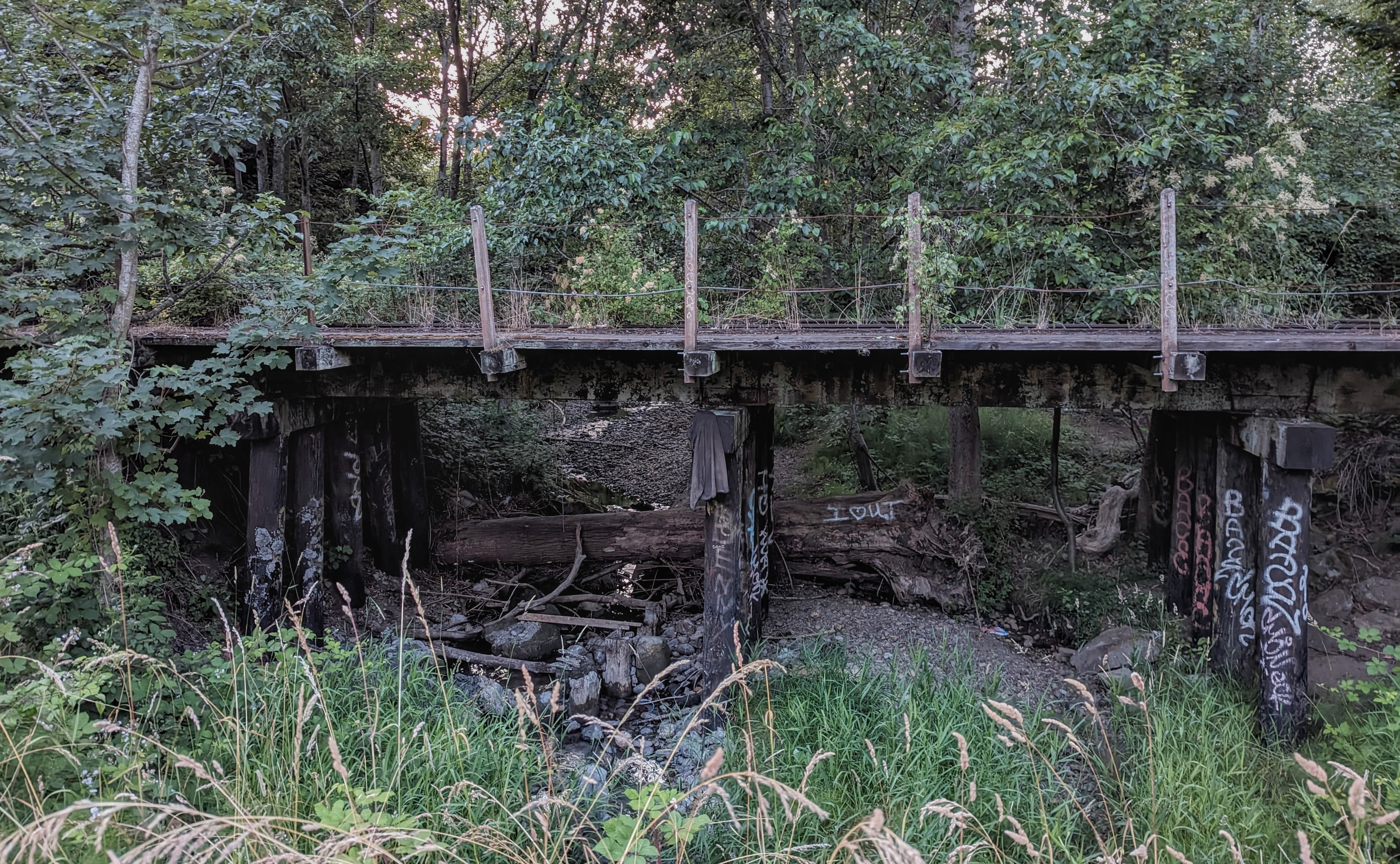
Baker Creek near its confluence with Squalicum Creek at Squalicum Way, Bellingham
