= Squalicum Creek =

Stream in Whatcom County, Washington, U.S.

Coordinates: 48°45′38″N 122°30′32″W

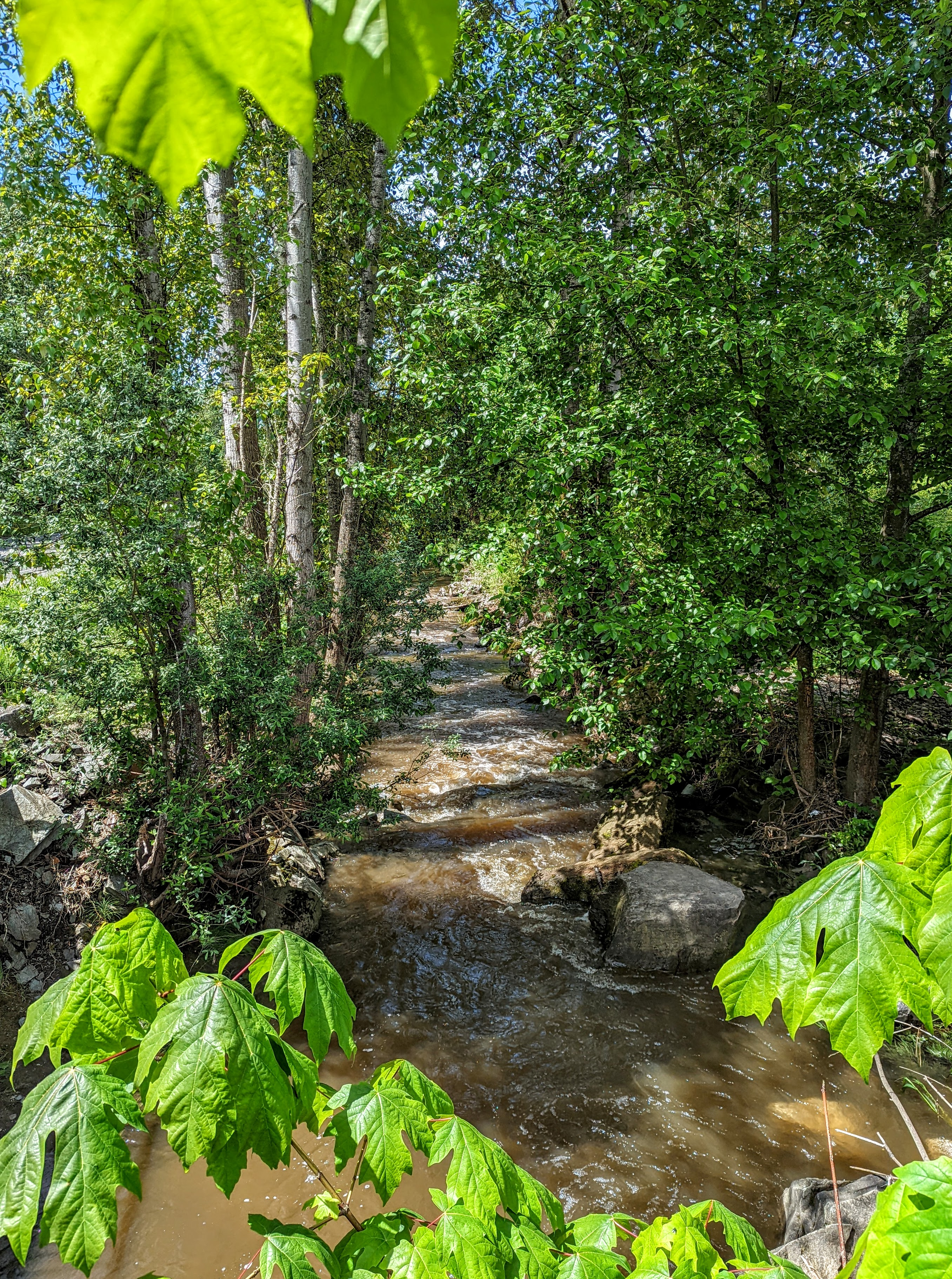
Squalicum Creek at Squalicum Park entrance, Bellingham, Washington

Squalicum Creek is a stream in Whatcom County, Washington, that flows through Bellingham, Washington, to Bellingham Bay. It drains an area of 22 square miles (57 km^{2}).

The Washington State Department of Transportation and the City of Bellingham have been working to improve the suitability of the creek, with headwaters in the Cascade foothills, as spawning habitat for pink, chum and coho salmon and cutthroat trout. From 2015 to 2020, the city government rerouted the creek around Bug Lake, an artificial pond created during construction of Interstate 5, to improve temperatures for fish and remove barriers.

The creek, Squalicum High School, and other locations named Squalicum around Bellingham are named for the native word meaning "place of the dog salmon".

== Tributaries ==
- Baker Creek

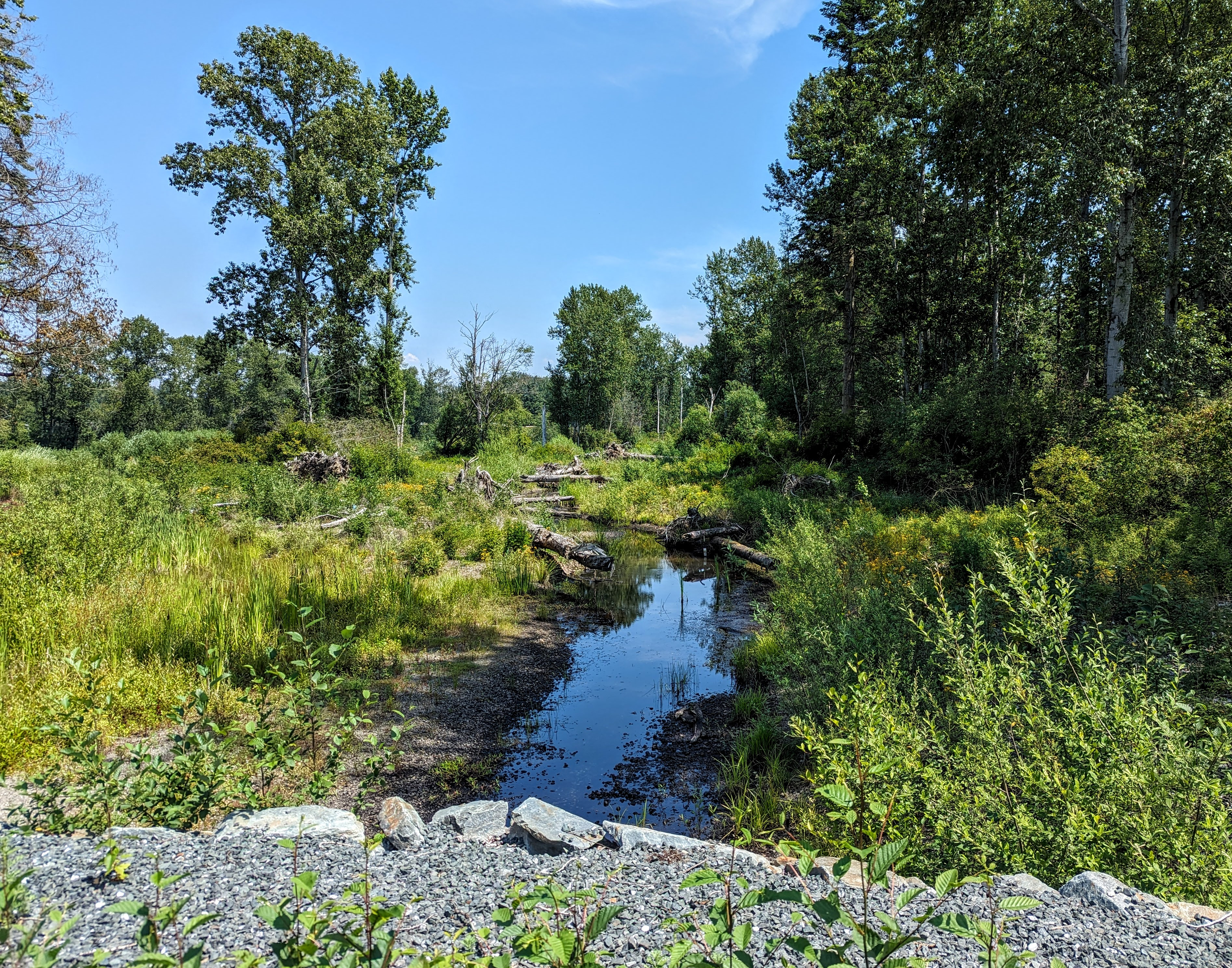
Squalicum Creek where it has been re-routed around Bug Lake, looking upstream from Squalicum Parkway

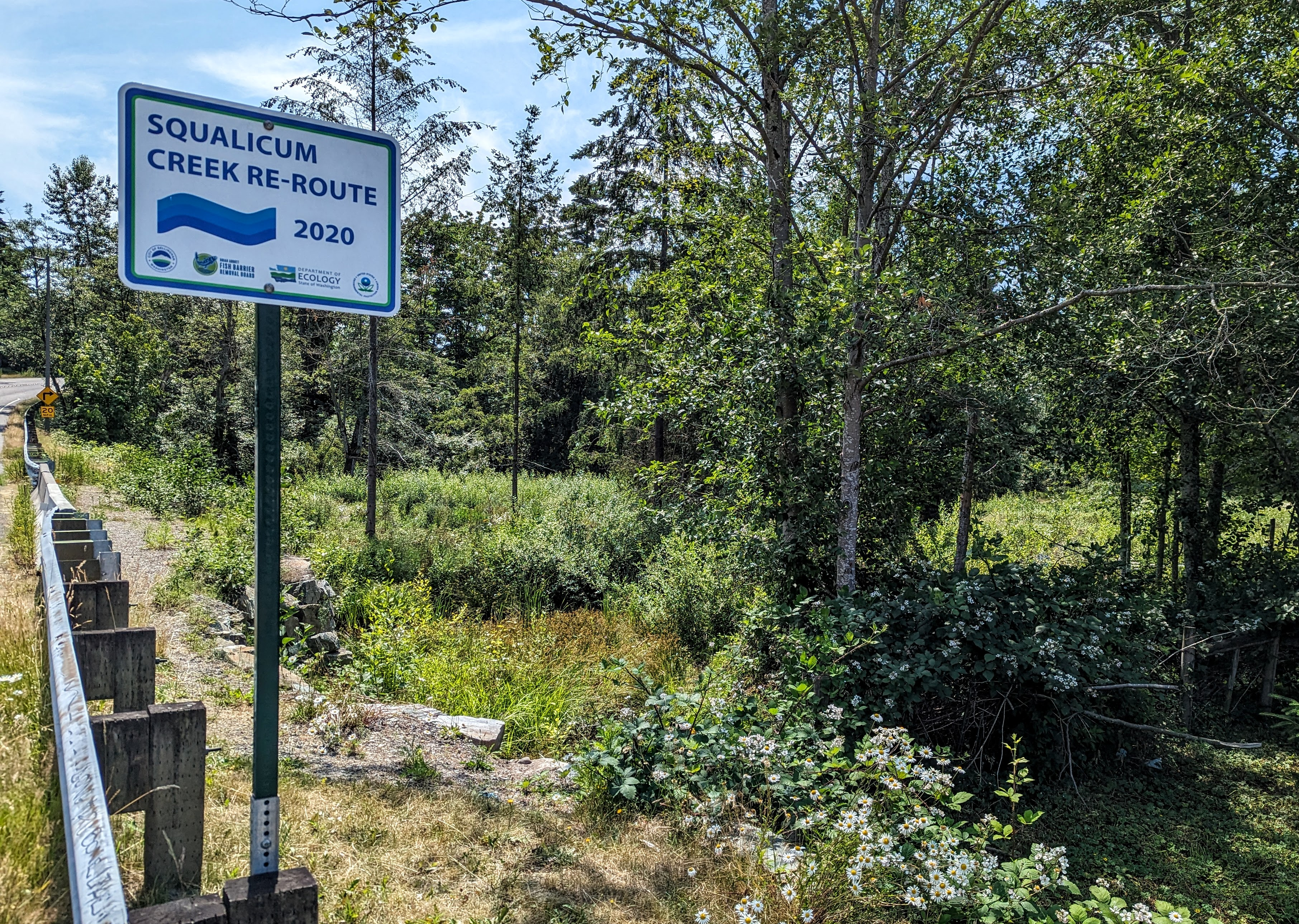
Squalicum Creek where it has been re-routed, just below Bug Lake, on the downstream side of Squalicum Parkway
